= Outline of semiotics =

Overview of and topical guide to semiotics

The following outline is provided as an overview of and topical guide to semiotics:

Semiotics – study of meaning-making, signs and sign processes (semiosis), indication, designation, likeness, analogy, metaphor, symbolism, signification, and communication. Semiotics is closely related to the field of linguistics, which, for its part, studies the structure and meaning of language more specifically. Also called semiotic studies, or semiology (in the Saussurean tradition).

== Classification of semiotics ==
Semiotics can be described as all of the following:

- Academic discipline – branch of knowledge that is taught and researched at the college or university level. Disciplines are defined (in part), and recognized by the academic journals in which research is published, and the learned societies and academic departments or faculties to which their practitioners belong.
- Social science – field of study concerned with society and human behaviours.

== Branches of semiotics ==
=== Three main branches ===
- Semantics – relation between signs and the things to which they refer; their denotata, or meaning
- Syntactics – relations among signs in formal structures
- Pragmatics – relation between signs and the effects they have on the people who use them

=== Subfields ===
- Biosemiotics: the study of semiotic processes at all levels of biology, or a semiotic study of living systems (e.g., Copenhagen–Tartu School). Annual meetings ("Gatherings in Biosemiotics") have been held since 2001.
- Semiotic anthropology and anthropological semantics.
- Cognitive semiotics: the study of meaning-making by employing and integrating methods and theories developed in the cognitive sciences. This involves conceptual and textual analysis as well as experimental investigations. Cognitive semiotics initially was developed at the Center for Semiotics at Aarhus University (Denmark), with an important connection with the Center of Functionally Integrated Neuroscience (CFIN) at Aarhus Hospital. Amongst the prominent cognitive semioticians are Per Aage Brandt, Svend Østergaard, Peer Bundgård, Frederik Stjernfelt, Mikkel Wallentin, Kristian Tylén, Riccardo Fusaroli, and Jordan Zlatev. Zlatev later in co-operation with Göran Sonesson established the Center for Cognitive Semiotics (CCS) at Lund University, Sweden.
- Comics semiotics: the study of the various codes and signs of comics and how they are understood.
- Computational semiotics: attempts to engineer the process of semiosis, in the study of and design for human–computer interaction or to mimic aspects of human cognition through artificial intelligence and knowledge representation.
- Cultural and literary semiotics: examines the literary world, the visual media, the mass media, and advertising in the work of writers such as Roland Barthes, Marcel Danesi, and Juri Lotman (e.g., Tartu–Moscow Semiotic School).
- Cybersemiotics: built on two already-generated interdisciplinary approaches: cybernetics and systems theory, including information theory and science; and Peircean semiotics, including phenomenology and pragmatic aspects of linguistics, attempts to make the two interdisciplinary paradigms—both going beyond mechanistic and pure constructivist ideas—complement each other in a common framework.
- Design semiotics or product semiotics: the study of the use of signs in the design of physical products; introduced by Martin Krampen and in a practitioner-oriented version by Rune Monö while teaching industrial design at the Institute of Design, Umeå University, Sweden.
- Ethnosemiotics: a disciplinary perspective which links semiotics concepts to ethnographic methods.
- Film semiotics: the study of the various codes and signs of film and how they are understood. Key figures include Christian Metz.
- Finite semiotics: an approach to the semiotics of technology developed by Cameron Shackell. It is used to both trace the effects of technology on human thought and to develop computational methods for performing semiotic analysis.
- Gregorian chant semiology: a current avenue of palaeographical research in Gregorian chant, which is revising the Solesmes school of interpretation.
- Hylosemiotics: an approach to semiotics that understands meaning as inference, which is developed through exploratory interaction with the physical world. It expands the concept of communication beyond a human-centered paradigm to include other sentient beings, such as animals, plants, bacteria, fungi, etc.
- Law and semiotics: one of the more accomplished publications in this field is the International Journal for the Semiotics of Law, published by International Association for the Semiotics of Law.
- Marketing semiotics (or commercial semiotics): an application of semiotic methods and semiotic thinking to the analysis and development of advertising and brand communications in cultural context. Key figures include Virginia Valentine, Malcolm Evans, Greg Rowland, Georgios Rossolatos. International annual conferences (Semiofest) have been held since 2012.
- Music semiology: the study of signs as they pertain to music on a variety of levels.
- Organisational semiotics: the study of semiotic processes in organizations (with strong ties to computational semiotics and human–computer interaction).
- Pictorial semiotics: an application of semiotic methods and semiotic thinking to art history.
- Semiotics of music videos: semiotics in popular music.
- Structuralism and post-structuralism in the work of Jacques Derrida, Michel Foucault, Louis Hjelmslev, Roman Jakobson, Jacques Lacan, Claude Lévi-Strauss, Roland Barthes, etc.
- Theatre semiotics: an application of semiotic methods and semiotic thinking to theatre studies. Key figures include Keir Elam.
- Visual semiotics: analyses visual signs; prominent modern founders to this branch are Groupe μ and Göran Sonesson.
- Semiotics of photography: is the observation of symbolism used within photography.
- Artificial intelligence semiotics: the observation of visual symbols and the symbols' recognition by machine learning systems. The phrase was coined by Daniel Hoeg, founder of Semiotics Mobility, due to Semiotics Mobility's design and learning process for autonomous recognition and perception of symbols by neural networks. The phrase refers to machine learning and neural nets application of semiotic methods and semiotic machine learning to the analysis and development of robotics commands and instructions with subsystem communications in autonomous systems context.
- Semiotics of mathematics: the study of signs, symbols, sign systems and their structure, meaning and use in mathematics and mathematics education.
- Product semiotics – study of the use of signs in the design of physical products. Introduced by Rune Monö while teaching Industrial Design at the Institute of Design, Umeå University, Sweden.
- Literary semiotics – approach to literary criticism informed by the theory of signs or semiotics. Semiotics, tied closely to the structuralism pioneered by Ferdinand de Saussure, was extremely influential in the development of literary theory out of the formalist approaches of the early twentieth century.
- Semiotic engineering – views HCI as computer-mediated communication between designers and users at interaction time. The system speaks for its designers in various types of conversations specified at design time. These conversations communicate the designers' understanding of who the users are, what they know the users want or need to do, in which preferred ways, and why.
- Semiotic information theory – considers the information content of signs and expressions as it is conceived within the semiotic or sign-relational framework developed by Charles Sanders Peirce.
- Social semiotics – expands the interpretable semiotic landscape to include all cultural codes, such as in slang, fashion, and advertising. It considers social connotations, including meanings related to ideology and power structures, in addition to denotative meanings of signs.
  - Urban semiotics – study of meaning in urban form as generated by signs, symbols, and their social connotations. It focuses on material objects of the built environment, such as streets, squares, parks, and buildings, but also abstract cultural constructs such as building codes, planning documents, unbuilt designs, real estate advertising, and popular discourse about the city, such as architectural criticism and real estate blogs.
- Phytosemiotics – the study of the sign processes in plants, or more broadly, the vegetative semiosis.
- Zoosemiotics – study of animal meaning-making and communication.

== History of semiotics ==
- History of semiotics
- Tartu-Moscow Semiotic School – scientific school of thought that was formed in 1964 and led by Juri Lotman. Among the other members of this school were Boris Uspenskij, Vyacheslav Ivanov, Vladimir Toporov, Mikhail Gasparov, Alexander Piatigorsky, Isaak I. Revzin, and others. As a result of their collective work, they established a theoretical framework around the semiotics of culture.

== Methods of semiotics ==
- Commutation test –
- Paradigmatic analysis –
- Syntagmatic analysis –

== Semiotic analyses ==
- Semiotic democracy
- Semiotic elements and classes of signs
- Semiotics of agriculture
- Semiotics of dress
- Semiotics of interactive media
- Semiotics of music videos
- Semiotics of photography
- Semiotics of social networking
- Semiotics of wrestling characters

== General semiotics concepts ==
- Biosemiotics –
- Code –
- Computational semiotics –
- Connotation –
- Decode –
- Denotation –
- Encode –
- Lexical –
- Literary semiotics –
- Modality –
- Representation (arts) –
- Salience –
- Semeiotic –
- Semiosis –
- Semiotic square –
- Semiosphere –
- Semiotic elements & sign classes –
- Sign –
- Sign relation –
- Umwelt –
- Value –

== Semiotics organizations ==
- International Association for Semiotic Studies
- International Association for the Semiotics of Law
- International Society for Biosemiotic Studies
- Semiotic Society of America

== Semiotics publications ==
- The American Journal of Semiotics
- Elements of Semiology
- Semiotica
- Semiotics: The Proceedings of the Semiotic Society of America
- Sign Systems Studies
- Versus

== Persons influential in semiotics ==
- Mikhail Bakhtin –
- Roland Barthes –
- Marcel Danesi –
- John Deely –
- Umberto Eco –
- Algirdas Julien Greimas –
- Félix Guattari –
- Louis Hjelmslev –
- Vyacheslav Ivanov –
- Roman Jakobson –
- Roberta Kevelson –
- Kalevi Kull –
- Juri Lotman –
- Charles S. Peirce –
- Augusto Ponzio –
- Ferdinand de Saussure –
- Thomas Sebeok –
- Michael Silverstein –
- Eero Tarasti –
- Vladimir Toporov –
- Jakob von Uexküll –

=== Cognitive semioticians ===
- Per Aage Brandt –
- Peer Bundgård –
- Riccardo Fusaroli –
- Svend Østergaard –
- Frederik Stjernfelt –
- Kristian Tylén –
- Mikkel Wallentin –
- Jordan Zlatev –
- Göran Sonesson –

=== Literary semioticians ===
- Roland Barthes –
- Marcel Danesi –
- Juri Lotman –

=== Social semioticians ===
- Roland Barthes
- Paul Cobley
- Michael Halliday
- Bob Hodge
- Christian Metz
- Virginia Valentine

== See also ==
- Structuralism
- Post-structuralism
- Aestheticization of violence
- Postmodernity
