= Semiofest =

Conference series and event on semiotics

Semiofest is the main worldwide conference series and event on commercial semiotics. Its focus is on the methods of semiotic analysis which are helpful in solving interpretational conflicts and providing tools for better design of social meaning-making spaces.

The topics covered include the applications of semiotics in marketing, brand development, design, advertising, applied aspects of social semiotics, ecosemiotics etc. The conference subtitle is "A Celebration of Semiotic Thinking".

Commercial semiotics applies results from semiotic anthropology, cultural semiotics, ecosemiotics and biosemiotics for multi-sided analysis of meaning-making.

== History ==
The initiators and first organisers of Semiofest were several British companies and agencies that provide semiotic consultancy. An aim of Semiofest is to bring together the specialists practicing semiotics in marketing and social consultancy, and academics researching and teaching semiotics in universities.

The conference have been organised in the following centres (and themes):

- 2012 – London
- 2013 – Barcelona
- 2014 – Shanghai ("Global Meets Local: A Cross-cultural Celebration of Semiotic Thinking")
- 2015 – Paris ("Fall in Love with Applied Semiotics")
- 2016 – Tallinn ("Semiotics and Culture of Innovation")
- 2017 – Toronto ("Media, Messages, and Meanings: Semiotics, Form and Content")
- 2018 – Mumbai ("Time of the Signs")
- 2020 – Mexico ("Resemiotization")
- 2022 – Mexico ("Resemiotization and Metaphors")
- 2024 – Porto
- 2026 – Warsaw ("Viscosity")

== See also ==
- Ecosemiotics
- Semiotics of fashion
- Semiotics of music videos
- Semiotics of photography
- Semiotics of social networking
