= Empathetic sound =

Film sound effect

Empathetic sound in a film refers to music or sound effects that match the present action or scene in rhythm, tone, and/or mood and aim to evoke that mood in the audience. The concept, coined by Michel Chion and also associated with Robert Stam, is derived from empathy, i.e., feeling the feelings of others. The opposite of empathetic sound is anempathetic sound.

Empathetic sound may be either non-diegetic, e.g., a sad song playing over a depressing or upsetting scene, or diegetic, e.g., a song playing on the radio that matches a character's feelings.
