= Apparatus theory =

Formerly popular theory in cinema studies

Apparatus theory, derived in part from Marxist film theory, semiotics, and psychoanalysis, was a dominant theory within cinema studies during the 1980s, following the 1960s when psychoanalytical theories for film were popular.

== Overview ==
Apparatus theory maintains that cinema is by nature ideological because its mechanics of representation are ideological, and because the films are created to represent reality. Its mechanics of representation include the camera and editing. The central position of the spectator within the perspective of the composition is also ideological. In the simplest instance the cinematic apparatus purports to set before the eye and ear realistic images and sounds. However, the technology disguises how that reality is put together frame by frame.

The meaning of a film, plus the way the viewing subject is constructed and the mechanics of the actual process and production of making the film affect the representation of the subject. This effect is ideological because it is a reproduced reality and the cinematic experience affects the viewer on a deep level. This theory is explored in the work of Jean-Louis Baudry. This is where the Marxist aspect of the theory comes into play.

The idea is that the passive viewers (or Marx's proletariat) cannot tell the difference between the world of cinema and film and the real world. These viewers identify with the characters on screen so strongly that they become susceptible to ideological positioning. In Baudry's theory of the apparatus he likens the movie-goer to someone in a dream. He relates the similarities of being in a darkened room, having someone else control your actions/what you do, and the inactivity and passivity of the two activities. He goes on to say that because movie-goers are not distracted by outside light, noise, etc., due to the nature of a movie theater, they are able to experience the film as if it were reality and they were experiencing the events themselves.

Apparatus theory also argues that cinema maintains the dominant ideology of the culture within the viewer. Ideology is not imposed on cinema, but is part of its nature and it shapes the way the audience thinks.

Apparatus theory follows an institutional model of spectatorship.

== Apparatus theorists ==
(this is an incomplete list)

- Gregory Ulmer
- Louis Althusser - Marxist writer who wrote about mirror mis-recognition and the role it plays in forming identities, to explore the relationship between cinema goers and film texts.
- Jean-Louis Comolli
- Christian Metz - argued that viewing film is only possible by voyeurism (or ‘scopophilia’: Greek for love of looking), best seen in silent film.
- Giorgio Agamben
- Laura Mulvey
- Peter Wollen
- Jean-Louis Baudry - argued that Bazin's film theory was metaphysical.

== See also ==
- Film semiotics
