= Culture theory =

Branch of semiotics and anthropology concerning societal norms, behaviors and artifacts

Culture theory is the branch of comparative anthropology and semiotics that seeks to define the heuristic concept of culture in operational and/or scientific terms.

== Overview ==
In the 19th century, "culture" was used by some to refer to a wide array of human activities, and by some others as a synonym for "civilization". In the 20th century, anthropologists began theorizing about culture as an object of scientific analysis. Some used it to distinguish human adaptive strategies from the largely instinctive adaptive strategies of animals, including the adaptive strategies of other primates and non-human hominids, whereas others used it to refer to symbolic representations and expressions of human experience, with no direct adaptive value. Both groups understood culture as being definitive of human nature.

According to some theories that have gained acceptance among anthropologists, culture exhibits the way that humans interpret their biology and their environment. According to this point of view, culture becomes such an integral part of human existence that it is the human environment, and most cultural change can be attributed to human adaptation to historical events. Moreover, given that culture is seen as the primary adaptive mechanism of humans and takes place much faster than human biological evolution, most cultural change can be viewed as culture adapting to itself.

Although most anthropologists try to define culture in such a way that it separates human beings from other animals, many human traits are similar to those of other animals, particularly the traits of other primates. For example, chimpanzees have big brains, but human brains are bigger. Similarly, bonobos exhibit complex sexual behaviour, but human beings exhibit much more complex sexual behaviours. As such, anthropologists often debate whether human behaviour is different from animal behaviour in degree rather than in kind; they must also find ways to distinguish cultural behaviour from sociological behaviour and psychological behavior.

Acceleration and amplification of these various aspects of culture change have been explored by complexity economist, W. Brian Arthur. In his book, The Nature of Technology, Arthur attempts to articulate a theory of change that considers that existing technologies (or material culture) are combined in unique ways that lead to novel new technologies. Behind that novel combination is a purposeful effort arising in human motivation. This articulation would suggest that we are just beginning to understand what might be required for a more robust theory of culture and culture change, one that brings coherence across many disciplines and reflects an integrating elegance.

== See also ==
- Cultural studies
- Culturology
- Cultural behavior
- Culture industry
- Critical theory
- Dual inheritance theory
- Engaged theory
- Intercultural relations
- Popular culture studies
- Semiotics of culture
- Structuralism
- Tartu–Moscow Semiotic School
