= Semiotics of culture =

Field of study

Semiotics of culture is a research field within semiotics that attempts to define culture from a semiotic perspective and as a type of human symbolic activity, creation of signs and a way of giving meaning to everything around. Therefore, here culture is understood as a system of symbols or meaningful signs. Because the main sign system is the linguistic system, the field is usually referred to as semiotics of culture and language. Under this field of study symbols are analyzed and categorized in a certain class within the hierarchal system. With postmodernity, metanarratives are no longer as pervasive and thus categorizing these symbols in this postmodern age is more difficult and rather critical.

The research field was of particular interest for the Tartu–Moscow Semiotic School (USSR). Linguists and semioticians from the Tartu School viewed culture as a hierarchical semiotic system consisting of a set of functions correlated to it, and linguistic codes that are used by social groups to maintain coherence. These codes are viewed as superstructures based on natural language, and here the ability of humans to symbolize is central.

Its study received a research basis also in Japan where the idea that culture and nature should not be contrasted and contradicted but rather harmonized was developed.

== See also ==
- Culture
- Cultural bias
- Culture theory
- Culture war
- Cultural dissonance
- Cultural imperialism
- (Anthropology of) Fashion
- Film semiotics
- Semiotics of dress
- Semiotics of fashion
- Semiotics of music videos
