= Jean-Louis Baudry =

French writer (1930–2015)

Jean-Louis Baudry (March 2, 1930 – October 3, 2015) was a French novelist, Tel Quel literary editor, and psychoanalytic film theorist. He was born and died in Paris.

He studied at the University of Paris. He is best known for "Ideological Effects of the Basic Cinematographic Apparatus" (1970) and "The Apparatus: Metapsychological Approaches to the Impression of Reality in Cinema" (1975), two essays which pioneered apparatus theory, a combination of Louis Althusser's concept of the ideological state apparatus and Jacques Lacan's theory of the mirror stage to analyse the cinema as an institution. His influential ideas were critiqued and developed by film semiotician Christian Metz and feminist film theorist Laura Mulvey in the mid-1970s.
