= Robert Stam =

American film theorist

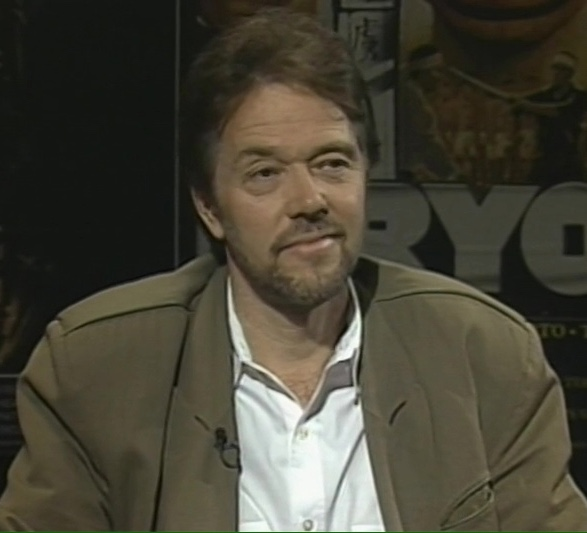
Stam discusses Simon of the Desert on CUNY TV's Cinema Then, Cinema Now (1992)

Robert Stam (born October 29, 1941) is an American film theorist working on film semiotics. He is a professor at New York University, where he teaches about French New Wave filmmakers. Stam has published widely on French literature, comparative literature, and on film topics such as film history and film theory. Together with Ella Shohat, he co-authored Unthinking Eurocentrism: Multiculturalism and the Media.

== Early life and education ==
Born in Paterson, New Jersey, Stam completed his Ph.D. in Comparative Literature at U.C. Berkeley in 1977, after which he went directly to New York University, where he has been teaching ever since. Stam's graduate work ranged across Anglo-American literature, French and Francophone literature, and Luso-Brazilian literature. His dissertation was published as a book, Reflexivity in Film and Literature (1985).

== Career ==
Stam has authored, co-authored and edited some seventeen books on film and cultural theory, literature and film, national cinema (French and Brazilian), aesthetic and politics, intellectual history, and comparative race studies and postcolonial studies. With work that has ranged across a number of different fields, Stam has participated in a number of post-structuralist and postcolonial “turns” within film and cultural studies. A 1983 Screen essay “Colonialism, Racism, and Representation” brought post-structuralist theory to bear on issues of representations of colonial history and racial oppression. Attempting to go beyond the methodological limitations of the then-dominant paradigm of “positive image” and “negative stereotype” analysis, Stam argued for an approach that emphasized not social accuracy or characterological merits but rather issues such as perspective, address, focalization, mediation, and the filmic orchestration of discourses.

=== Collaborations with Ella Shohat ===
The concern with issues of colonialism, postcolonialism, race, and cultural difference also found expression in a number of seminal texts co-authored with Ella Shohat. Their 1985 Screen essay “The Cinema After Babel: Language, Difference, Power,” introduced a Bakhtinian “translinguistic” and trans-structuralist turn into the study of language difference, translation, and postsynchronization in the cinema. Their Unthinking Eurocentrism: Multiculturalism and the Media (Routledge, 1994) formed part of and helped shape the surge of writing about race, colonialism, identity politics, and postcoloniality in the 1990s. Edward Said called Unthinking Eurocentrism a “brilliant” and landmark book". The book combines two strands of work – an ambitious study of colonialist discourse and Eurocentrism – and a comprehensive and transnational study of cinematic texts related to those issues.

One feature, which came to characterize all of the Stam-Shohat collaborations was looking at theses issues within a longue timespan by placing the various "1492s" (i.e. the Inquisition against Jews, the expulsion of the Muslims, the conquest of the Americas, TransAtlantic slavery) at the center of the debates. A related strategy was to stress the centrality of Indigenous peoples for the history of radical thought and resistance in the Atlantic world, which they began in their 2006 book Flagging Patriotism to call the “Red Atlantic.” Unthinking Eurocentrism addressed such issues as “Eurocentrism versus Polycentrism,” “Formations of Colonialist Discourse,” “The Imperial Imaginary,” “Tropes of Empire,” the “Esthetics of Resistance,” “postcolonial hybridity,” and “indigenous media.” (A updated, 20th anniversary edition was published in 2014.)

Stam and Shohat continued with an anthology entitled Multiculturalism, Postcoloniality, and Transnational Media (Rutgers, 2003); followed by a more political polemic which excoriated the militaristic pseudo-patriotism of the George Bush/Dick Cheney period -- Flagging Patriotism: Crises in Narcissism and Anti-Americanism (Routledge, 2006). Race in Translation: Culture Wars Around the Postcolonial Atlantic (NYU, 2012), finally, dealt with the postwar debates about colonialism, postcoloniality, race, multiculture and Affirmative Action in three cultural zones—the U.S., and Anglophone zone, France and the Francophone zone, and Brazil and the Lusophone zone. Contesting the monolingual and Anglo-Americano-centric approach to these issues, the book elaborates such concepts as “the seismic shift” provoked by the decolonization of culture, the radicalization of the academic disciplines, the philosophical centrality of indigenous thought, the “left/right” convergence on identity politics, and “inter-colonial narcissism.”

=== Adaptation studies ===
Stam has also been a major figure within the “transtextual turn” in adaptation and intertextuality studies. Stam's later work in literature and film formed part of and helped advance the field of adaptation studies, which has been undergoing a boom since the turn of the 21st century. Stam's essay “Beyond Fidelity,” included in the James Naremore 1999 anthology Film Adaptation, called for a larger paradigm shift in which authors like Naremore, Dudley Andrews, Kamilla Elliot, Deborah Cartmell, Imelda Whelehan, Thomas Leitch, Jack Boozer, Christine Geraghty, Alessandra Raengo, and Linda Hutcheon moved from a binary novel-film fidelity approach to a more open transtextual approach.

The interest in film-literature relations culminated in two monographs and two anthologies. Literature through Film: Realism, Magic, and the Art of Adaptation (Blackwell, 2005) offered a historicized account of key trends in the history of the novel – the proto-magic realism of a Cervantes, the colonialist realism of a Defoe (and his critics), the parodic reflexivity of a Henry Fielding or Machado de Assis, or proto-cinematic perspectivalism of a Flaubert, the neurotic narrators of a Dostoyevsky or a Nabokov, the feminist experimentations of Clarice Lispector and Marguerite Duras, and the “marvelous latin-american real” of Mario de Andrade and Alejo Carpentier, all as seen through the many filmic adaptations – both “faithful” and revisionist – of their work.

Francois Truffaut and Friends: Modernism, Sexuality, and Adaptation (Rutgers, 2006), meanwhile, explored the “transtextual diaspora” generated by a highly literary ménage-a-trois in the 1920s that led to the books and published journals of Henri-Pierre Roche, Franz Hessel and Helen Hessel, as well as three films by Truffaut based on the life and work of Roche (Jules and Jim, Two Englishwomen, and The Man Who Loved Women). Two anthologies co-edited with Alessandra Raengo (both published by Blackwell) fleshed out the project: Literature and Film: A Guide to the Theory and Practice of Adaptation (Blackwell, 2005), and Companion to Literature and Film (Blackwell, 2004).

=== Film theory and multiculturalism ===
Another field of intervention for Stam has been in cultural theory, especially in Subversive Pleasures: Bakhtin, Cultural Criticism, and Film (Johns Hopkins, 1989), the first book-length study to extrapolate for film and cultural studies Bakhtin's conceptual categories, such as “translinguistics” and “dialogism” and the “carnivalesque.” Stam has also been an advocate-exegete of semiotics, poststructuralism, and film theory in such books as New Vocabularies in Film Semiotics: Structuralism, Poststructuralism, and Beyond (Routledge, 1992) and Film Theory: An Introduction (Blackwell, 2000), the first book to recount the history of film theory from its beginnings to the present within a transnational framework that included Latin America, Africa and Asia alongside Europe and North America. Film Theory: An Introduction was published in tandem with two Blackwell anthologies co-edited with Toby Miller both from 2000: Film and Theory and A Companion to Film Theory.

Brazilian cinema, literature, and popular culture form another node in Stam's research. He co-edited Brazilian Cinema (1982) with Randal Johnson. Tropical Multiculturalism: A Comparative History of Race in Brazilian Cinema and Culture (Duke, 1997) offered the first book-length study in English of racial representation, especially of Afro-Brazilians, during the century of Brazilian Cinema, within a comparative framework in relation to similar issues in American cinema.

== Awards and honors ==
Stam has won Woodrow Wilson, NDEA, Rockefeller, Fulbright, and Guggenheim Fellowships. In 2009, he was named a Fellow at the Shelby Cullom Davis Center for Historical Studies at Princeton, where he presented a paper on "The Red Atlantic". In 2006, he co-taught (with Ella Shohat) a seminar on "The Culture Wars in Translation" at Cornell's Society for Criticism and Theory. In 2003, Stam was honored at the Curitiba Film Festival for his "Noteworthy Service to Brazilian Cinema". In 2002, he was named “University Professor” at New York University, the institutions highest honor. In 1998: Honored by Africana Studies "Evening of Readings from Recently Published Work by Critically Acclaimed Authors" In 1995: a panel was dedicated to Unthinking Eurocentrism as opening for series of book-related events at the Museum of Modern Art in San Francisco. Unthinking Eurocentrism: Multiculturalism and the Media (co-authored with Ella Shohat) won the Katherine Singer Kovács "Best Film Book" Award in 1994. Stam's Subversive Pleasures; Bakhtin, Cultural Criticism and Film was a Choice "Outstanding Academic Book of the Year" in 1989 and Runner-Up for the Katherine Singer Kovács "Best Film Book" Award in the same year.

== Selected publications ==
=== Books ===
- Indigeneity and the Decolonizing Gaze: Transnational Imaginaries, Media Aesthetics, and Social Thought (Bloomsbury, 2023)
- Keywords in Subversive Film / Media Aesthetics (Wiley-Blackwell, 2015)
- Race in Translation: Culture Wars in the Postcolonial Atlantic (Routledge, 2012) coauthored with Ella Shohat
- Flagging Patriotism: Crises of Narcissism and Anti-Americanism (Routledge, 2006) coauthored with Ella Shohat
- Francois Truffaut and Friends: Modernism, Sexuality, and Film Adaptation (Rutgers, 2006)
- Literature through Film: Realism, Magic and the Art of Adaptation (Blackwell, 2005)
- Literature and Film: A Guide to the Theory and Practice of Film Adaptation (Blackwell, 2005)
- Companion to Literature and Film (Blackwell, 2004)
- Film and Theory: An Anthology (Blackwell, 2000)
- Multiculturalism, Postcoloniality, and Transnational Media (Rutgers, 2000), coauthored with Ella Shohat
- A Companion to Film Theory (Blackwell, 1999), coedited with Toby Miller
- Tropical Multiculturalism: A Comparative History of Race in Brazilian Cinema and Culture (Duke, 1997)
- Unthinking Eurocentrism: Multiculturalism and the Media (Routledge, 1994), coauthored with Ella Shohat
- Bakhtin (Attica 1992)
- New Vocabularies in Film Semiotics: Structuralism, Post-Structuralism and Beyond (Routledge, 1992)
- Subversive Pleasures: Bakhtin, Cultural Criticism and Film (Johns Hopkins, 1989)
- Reflexivity in Film and Literature (UMI Press, 1985)
- Brazilian Cinema (Associated University Presses, 1982)
- O Espetáculo Interrompido (The Interrupted Spectacle) in Portuguese (Paze e Terra, 1981)

=== Articles ===
- "Hitchcock and Buñuel: Authority, Desire and the Absurd," in Walter Raubicheck and Walter Srebnick, eds. Hitchcock's Rereleased Films (Detroit:Wayne State, 1991).
- "Mobilizing Fictions: The Gulf War, the Media and the Recruitment of the Spectator," Public Culture Vol.4, No.2 (Spring 1992).
- "From Hybridity to the Aesthetics of Garbage," Social Identities, Vol. 3, No. 2 (1997)
- "Transnationalizing Comparison: The Uses and Abuses of Cross-Cultural Analogy," co-written with Ella Shohat. New Literary History, Vol. 40, No. 3 (Summer 2009)
- "The Cinema after Babel: Language, Difference and Power," Screen, Vol. XXVI, Nos. 3-4 (May- Aug 1985).
- "Colonialism, Racism and Representation," Screen, Vol. XXIV, No. 2(Mar/April 1983).
