= Anempathetic sound =

Indifferent sound enhances tragic apathy in film

Anempathetic sound in a film is the opposite of empathetic sound: it consists of music or sound effects that exhibit an indifference to the current tone, emotion, or plot-point of the film. This type of sound can thereby enhance a sense of tragic apathy and insignificance, as when a radio continues to play a happy tune when a character dies, or in Hitchcock's Psycho the continued sound of the shower running after Marion Crane has been killed, as if nothing has happened.
