= Computational semiotics =

Interdisciplinary field

Computational semiotics is an interdisciplinary field that applies, conducts, and draws on research in logic, mathematics, the theory and practice of computation, formal and natural language studies, the cognitive sciences generally, and semiotics proper. The term encompasses both the application of semiotics to user interface design in software and, conversely, the use of formal methods for performing semiotic analysis. The former focuses on what semiotics can bring to computation; the latter on what computation can bring to semiotics.

== Semiotics of computation ==
A common theme of this work is the adoption of a sign-theoretic perspective on issues of artificial intelligence and knowledge representation. Many of its applications lie in the field of human-computer interaction (HCI) and fundamental devices of recognition.

One part of this field, known as algebraic semiotics, combines aspects of algebraic specification and social semiotics, and has been applied to user interface design.

== Computational methods for semiotics ==
This strand involves formalizing semiotic methods of analysis and implementing them as algorithms on computers to process large digital data sets. These data sets are typically textual but semiotics opens the way for analysis of all manner of other data. Existing work provides methods for automated opposition analysis and generation of semiotic squares; metaphor identification; and image analysis. Shackell has suggested that a new field of Natural Semiotic Processing should emerge to extend natural language processing into areas such as persuasive technology, marketing and brand analysis that have significant cultural or non-linguistic aspects. On the other side, Meunier argues that semiotics and computation are compatible and combining them provides more logical consistency in understanding forms of meaning.

== See also ==
- Artificial intelligence
- Computational linguistics
- Computer-human interaction
- Formal language
- Information theory
- Knowledge representation
- Computational semantics
- Logic of information
- Meaning
- Natural language
- Relational database
- Semiotic engineering
- Semiotic information theory
- User interface
