= Semiotics of photography =

Semiotics is the study of meaning-making on the basis of signs. Semiotics of photography is the observation of symbolism used within photography or "reading" the picture. This article refers to realistic, unedited photographs not those that have been manipulated in any way. Roland Barthes was one of the first people to study the semiotics of images. He developed a way to understand the meaning of images. Most of Barthes' studies related to advertising, but his concepts can apply to photography as well.

== Denotation ==
Denotation refers to the meaning hidden in symbols or images. A denotation is "what we see" in the picture or what is "there" in the picture. According to author Clive Scott, this is another way of saying that a photograph has both a signified and a referent, is both coded and encoded. This is to re-emphasize the co-existence of the iconic and indexical. In photography the photo itself is the signifier, the signified is what the image is or represents. The literal meaning of the image.

== Connotation ==
Connotation (Semiotics) is arbitrary in that the meanings brought to the image are based on rules or conventions that the reader has learnt. Connotation attaches additional meaning to the first signifier, which is why the first signifier is often described in multiple words that include things like camera angle, color, lighting, etc. It is the immediate cultural meaning from what is seen in the picture, but not what is actually there. Connotation is what is implied by the image.

== Coded iconic ==
According to Roland Barthes the coded iconic message is the story that the image portrays. This message is easily understood and the images represent a clear relationship. The "reader" of the image applies their knowledge to the encoding of the photo. An image of a bowl of fruit for example might imply still life, freshness or market stalls.

== Noncoded iconic ==
Noncoded iconic is another part of Barthes' theory of understanding images. Noncoded has nothing to do with the emotions from the image as a whole. It is the "literal" denotation, the recognition of identifiable objects in the photograph, irrespective of the larger societal code. Using the bowl of fruit example, this photograph is just that, a bowl of fruit. A non-coded iconic has no deeper meaning, the image is exactly what it shows.

== See also ==
- Advertising
- Art history
- Visual communication
