= Semiotics of social networking =

Study of symbols and signs in social settings

The semiotics of social networking discusses the images, symbols and signs used in systems that allow users to communicate and share experiences with each other. Examples of social networking systems include Facebook, Twitter and Instagram.

== Semiotics ==
Semiotics is a discipline that studies images, symbols, signs and other similarly related objects in an effort to understand their use and meaning. Semiotic structuralism seeks the meaning of these objects within a social context. Post-structuralist theories take tools from structuralist semiotics in combination with social interaction, creating social semiotics. Social semiotics is “a branch of the field of semiotics which investigates human signifying practices in specific social and cultural circumstances and which tries to explain meaning-making as a social practice.” “Social semiotics also examines semiotic practices, specific to a culture and community, for the making of various kinds of texts and meanings in various situational contexts and contexts of culturally meaningful activity”. Social semiotics is concerned with studying human interactions.

== Social networking ==
Social networking is the communication among people within a virtual social space. This medium of communication allows insight into the significance of social semiotics. “Millions of people now interact through blogs, collaborate through wikis, play multiplayer games, publish podcasts and video, build relationships through social network sites and evaluate all the above forms of communication through feedback and ranking mechanisms”. Social semiotics “unlike speech, writing necessitates some sort of technology in the form of person device interaction”. Social semiotics functions through the triad of communication or Peircean semiotics in the form of sign, object, interpretant (Chart 1) and “Human, Machine, Tag (Information)” (Chart 2). In Peircean semiotics (Chart 1), "A sign…[in the form of representamen] is something which stands to somebody for something in some respect or capacity. It addresses somebody, that is, creates in the mind of that person an equivalent sign, or perhaps a more developed sign. That sign which it creates I call the interpretant of the first sign. The sign stands for an object, not in all respects, but in reference to a sort of idea which I have something called the ground of the representamen".

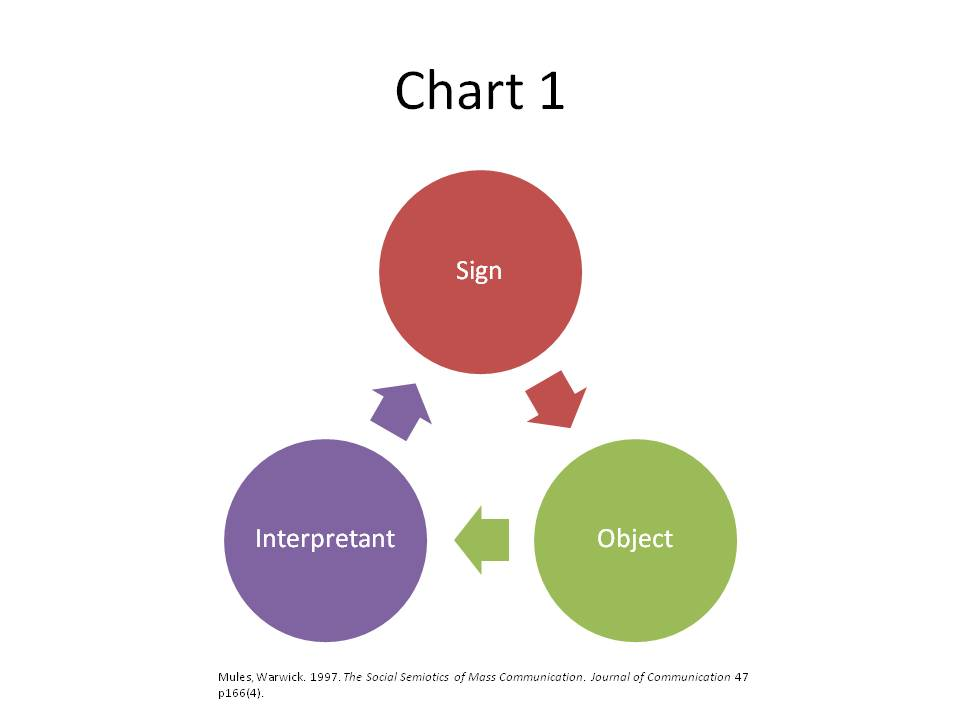
Sign, Object, Interpretant

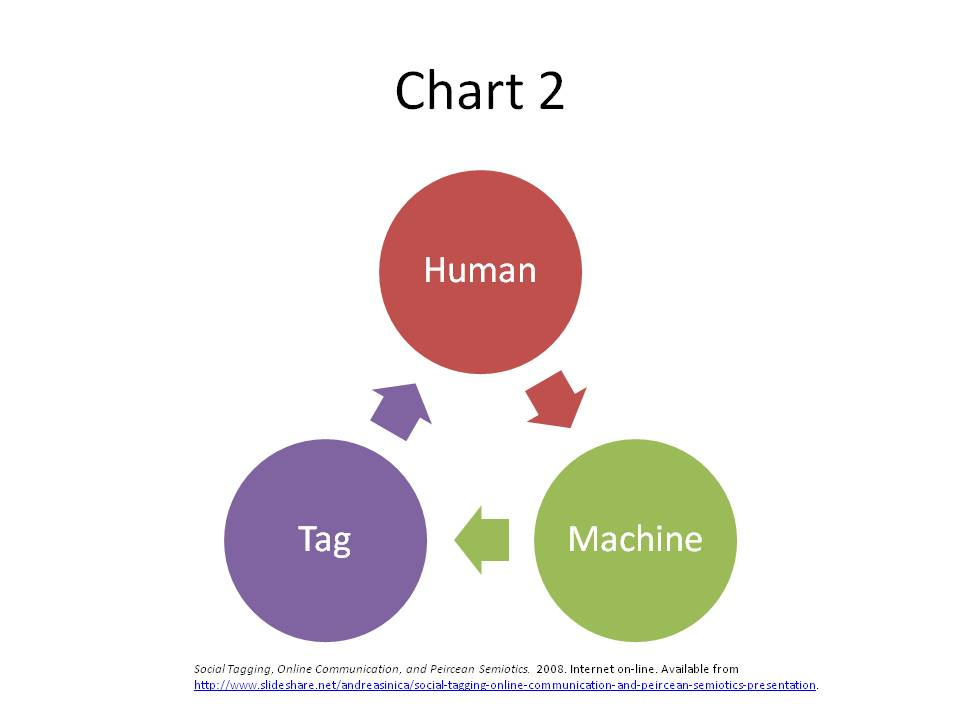
Human, Machine, Tag

Social semiotics

This example of the triangle of Human, Machine, Tag is shown when looking at tagging photographs on Facebook (Chart 3). The Human takes the photo on a camera and puts the digital file (information) on the Machine, the Machine is then navigated to Facebook where the file is downloaded. The Human has the Machine Tag the photo with information (e. g., names, places, data) for other Humans to see. This process then can be continued (see Chart 2). “Collaborative tagging has been quickly gaining ground because of its ability to recruit the activity of web users into effectively organizing and sharing large amounts of information”.

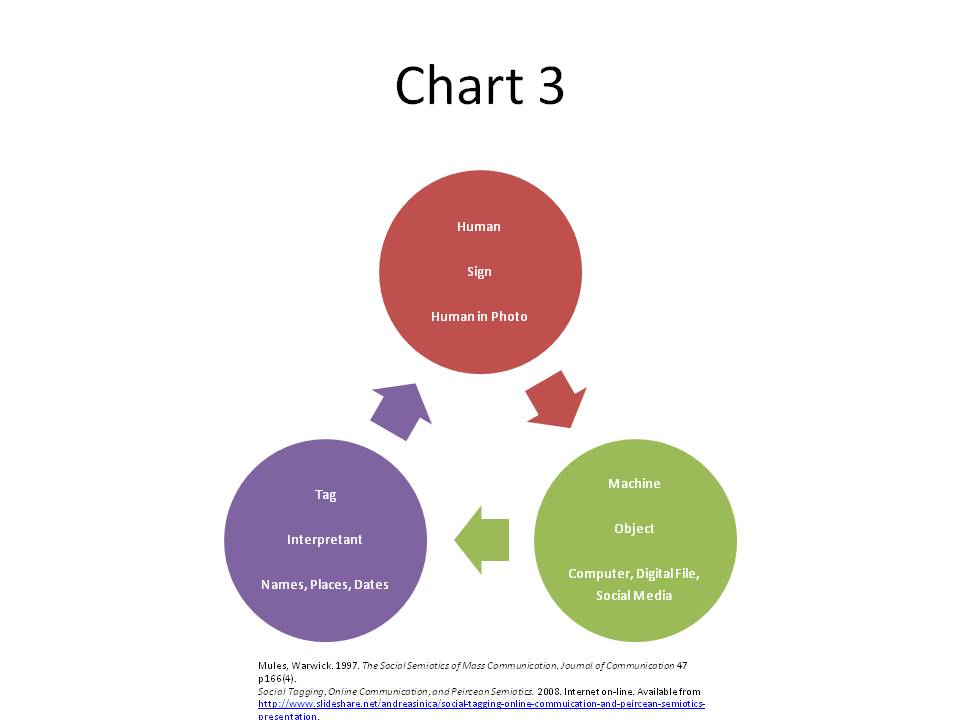
Semiotics of social media

== See also ==
- Social semiotics
- Meaning-making
