= Christian Metz (theorist) =

French film theorist (1931–1993)

- Born: 12 December 1931; Béziers, France
- Died: 7 September 1993 (aged 61); Paris, France

Academic background
- Education: École Normale Supérieure; University of Paris V
- Influences: Jean-Louis Baudry; Ferdinand de Saussure

Academic work
- Institutions: EHESS
- Main interests: Film studies, media studies
- Notable works: Language and Cinema; The Imaginary Signifier: Psychoanalysis and the Cinema
- Notable ideas: Film semiotics

Christian Metz (French: [mɛts]; December 12, 1931 – September 7, 1993) was a French film theorist, best known for pioneering film semiotics, the application of theories of signification to the cinema. He argued that cinema should be analyzed not as a strict language system (''langue''), but rather as a language (''langage'') organized by specific narrative codes. During the 1970s, his work had a major impact on film theory in France, Britain, Latin America, and the United States. As Constance Penley flatly stated in Camera Obscura, "Modern film theory begins with Metz."

== Biography ==
Metz was born in Béziers.

He lectured at the School for Advanced Studies in the Social Sciences (EHESS).

In 1964, he published the article "Le cinéma : langue ou langage?" ("Cinema: language or language-system?") in the journal Communications, and the following books over the next 25 years: Essays on the Signification of Cinema (1968 and 1973), Language and Cinema (1971), Semiotic Essays (1977), The Imaginary Signifier: Psychoanalysis and the Cinema (1977).

Metz died in Paris, aged 61, having taken his own life.

== Key concepts ==
=== Film semiotics and the grand syntagmatique ===
In Film Language: A Semiotics of Cinema, Metz focuses on narrative structure, proposing the "grand syntagmatique", a system for categorizing scenes (known as "syntagms") in films.

=== Psychoanalysis and apparatus theory ===
Metz applied both Sigmund Freud's psychoanalysis and Jacques Lacan's mirror theory to the cinema, proposing that the reason film is popular as an art form lies in its ability to be both an imperfect reflection of reality and a method to delve into the unconscious dream state.

His work has been critiqued by Jean Mitry in 1987 in Semiotics and the Analysis of Film, and virulently so by Jean-François Tarnowski in Positif.

In his final work, Impersonal Enunciation, Metz "uses the concept of enunciation to articulate how films 'speak' and explore where this communication occurs, offering critical direction for theorists who struggle with the phenomena of new media." Published in French in 1991, Impersonal Enunciation received little attention in the English-speaking world until it was translated in 2016, an indicator of a resurgence of interest in Metz as a scholar whose work on multi-screen environments was before its time.

== Select bibliography ==
- Film Language: A Semiotics of the Cinema (1968; English trans., University of Chicago Press, 1990; ISBN 978-0-226-52130-5)
- The Imaginary Signifier: Psychoanalysis and the Cinema (1977; English trans., Indiana University Press, 1986; ISBN 978-0-253-20380-9)
- Psychoanalysis and Cinema: The Imaginary Signifier (1977; English trans., Palgrave Macmillan, 1983; ISBN 978-0-333-36640-0)
- Language and Cinema (1971; English trans., Mouton, 1974; ISBN 978-90-279-2682-1)
- Impersonal Enunciation, or the Place of Film (1991; English trans., Columbia University Press, 2016; ISBN 978-0-231-17367-4)

== See also ==
- Film semiotics
- Apparatus theory
- Structuralism
