= Ethnosemiotics =

Ethnosemiotics is a disciplinary perspective which links semiotics concepts to ethnographic methods.

== Overview ==
Algirdas Julien Greimas and Joseph Courtés defined for the first time ethnosemiotics in Semiotics and language: an analytical dictionary.

"Ethno-semiotics is not truly an autonomous semiotics. If it were, it would be in competition with a field of knowledge already established under the name of ethnology or anthropology, whose contribution to the advent of semiotics itself is considerable. Rather, it is a privileged area of curiosities and of methodological exercises ... . Given that general semiotics authorizes the treatment of non-linguistic (gestual, somatic, etc.) syntagmatic concatenations as discourses or texts, the field of ethno-linguistics can be enlarged to become an ethno-semiotics; analyses, still rare, of rituals and ceremonies lead us to suppose that ethnology can become, once again, the privileged locus for the construction of general models of signifying behavior."

During the 2000s, in Italy, the interest toward the discipline has been renewed thanks to the studies and the researches of Maurizio del Ninno, Tarcisio Lancioni, and Francesco Marsciani. Under the direction of Francesco Marsciani, in Bologna in 2007 the Ethnosemiotic Centre of the Bologna University (CUBE) was founded, active in different fields of inquiry. In 2015, CUBE's experience led to the series Quaderni di Etnosemiotica and the Ethnosemiotics lab.

== Focus and fields of inquiry ==
The ethnosemiologist analyses the systems of signifiers which are individuated in specific cultural contexts through the observation and the application of the ethnographic methods. At the present, the principal researchers which have been realized are focused on urban spaces, therapy, rituals, folklore, everyday practices. In Italy we can distinguish two approaches to ethnosemiotics:

- the Urbin school, founded by Maurizio del Ninno, which follows the theoretical framework of Claude Lévi-Strauss and Georges Dumézil, close to French Social Anthropology.
- the Bologna-Siena school, founded by Tarcisio Lancioni and Francesco Marsciani, which were concerned by the development of a set of concepts and methods to apply semiotic analysis to different aspects of everyday life.

From 2015 the Ethnosemiotics Lab leads researches both in the theoretical and the methodological field. Developed inside CUBE, active at the Bologna University, it conducts multidisciplinary researches. The synergy between ethnographic observation and the analysis of the manifested values offers active results from the point of view of the capacity to describe social phenomena.

== See also ==
- Semiotics
- Ethnography
- Ethnology
- Social anthropology

== Bibliography ==
- (IT) Accardo Lorenza, Donatiello Paola, Liborio Elena, Palestrini Maddalena, Via Mascarella. Declinazioni di uno spazio denso, Bologna, Esculapio, 2015.
- (FR) De Certeau Michel, L'invention du quotidien. I Arts de faire, Éditions Gallimard, 1990; eng. tr., The Practice of Everyday Life, trans. Steven Rendall, University of California Press, Berkeley 1984.
- Del Ninno Maurizio, (a cura di), Etnosemiotica. Questioni di metodo, Meltemi, Roma, 2007.
- (FR-ENG) Greimas Algirdas Julien e Courtés Joseph, Sémiotique. Dictionnaire raisonné de la théorie du langage, Parigi, Hachette, 1979. eng. tr., Semiotics and language: an analytical dictionary Indiana University Press, 1982.
- (IT) Marsciani Francesco, Lancioni Tarcisio, La pratica come testo: per una etnosemiotica del mondo quotidiano; in Marrone, Gianfranco, Dusi, Nicola, Lo Feudo, Giorgio, (a cura di), Narrazione ed esperienza: intorno a una semiotica della vita quotidiana, 2007.
- (PT) Marsciani Francesco, Introdução à etnossemiótica, Centro de pesquisas Sociossemióticas, São Paulo, 2012.
- Marsciani Francesco, Tracciati di etnosemiotica, Franco Angeli, Milano, 2007.
- (FR) Marsciani Francesco, À propos de quelques questions inactuelles en théorie de la signification in Actes Sémiotiques, nº 117, 2014.
- Mazzarino Giuseppe, Il potere dell'ipnosi. Proposte teoriche per un'etnosemiotica, Esculapio, Bologna, 2015
- (ENG) Sbriccoli Tommaso, Jacoviello Stefano, (a cura di), 2012, Shifting borders. European perspectives on creolisation, Cambridge Scholar Publishing, Newcastle.
