= Semiotic anthropology =

Field of study

Semiotic anthropology is the process of using the cognitive tools of semiotics (theory of signs) to understand social structures from the anthropological perspective.

The phrase was first used by Milton Singer (1978), whose work brought together the semiotics of Charles Sanders Peirce and Roman Jakobson with theoretical streams that had long been flowing in and around the University of Chicago, where Singer taught. In the late 1970s, Michael Silverstein, a young student of Jakobson's at Harvard University, joined Singer in Chicago's Department of Anthropology. Since that time, anthropological work inspired by Peirce's semiotic have proliferated, in part as students of Singer and Silverstein have spread out across the country, developing semiotic-anthropological agendas of their own.

== Overview ==
Semiotic anthropology has its precursor in Malinowski's contextualism (which may be called anthropological semantics), which was later resumed by John Rupert Firth. Anthropological approaches to semantics are alternative to the three major types of semantics approaches: linguistic semantics, logical semantics, and general semantics. Other independent approaches to semantics are philosophical semantics and psychological semantics.

== See also ==
- Contextualism
- Susan Gal
- Symbolic anthropology
