= Semiotics of music videos =

Semiotics of music videos is the observation of symbolism used within music videos.

== Overview ==
Semiotics in popular music, or mesomusica, is different from semiotics in other musical forms, because pop music denotes a cultural object (Matusitz, 2004). Popular music has many signs in itself because it has many components and uses, but it also appeals to the emotions of a generation. Music is the “logical expression” of feelings, a "symbolic form". Music videos are an example of syntagm, wherein interacting signifiers form a meaningful whole. Music videos are also considered a multimodal genre because one semiotic system is joined syntagmatically to another semiotic system, which results in a signified indexical meaning. The process of music correlated with visuals can be described in terms of two basic mechanisms: temporal synchronicity and cross-modal homology. By incorporating the two modalities, sound and image, we can interpret a unified syntagm. Music videos are known to be visually secondary signified in combination with the semantic content of the lyrics. Semiotics in music videos is different from a pragmatic analysis because we can uphold that semiotics searches for meaning by considering sign production and progress, while pragmatics searches for meaning by considering the intentions of semantics and the context it has evolved in.

There are early critics of the importance of analyzing music videos as a semiotic system. Frederic Jameson's definition of music videos is as a schizophrenic string of isolated, discontinuous signifiers, failing to link up into a coherent sequence, thus a string without a center.

== Invisible editing ==
Many semiotic analysts have examined music videos to decode messages that are being sent to viewers.

Invisible editing (a semiotic term) refers to what film editors use to almost decode a song's message for the audience through narrative actions. Daniel Chandler's example from famous film editor Ralph Rosenblum describes this progression: "a man awakens suddenly in the middle of the night, bolts up in bed, stares ahead intensely, and twitches his nose. Then the film directs towards a room where two people are desperately fighting a billowing blaze" (Chandler, pp. 166, 2007). Because of the actions of the actors, the audience is aware of the next scene before it is shown.

Other examples of invisible editing in music videos are in a more formal narrative style, consisting of a plot or storyline of events and characters. Music videos-making that use a narrative-style script is considered as the more formal approach because the editing involved adds emphasis to the song's chorus, giving it a deeply-ingrained musical archetype. Michael Jackson's Thriller music video is one such work developed from a narrative script. However, Thriller's storyline is also seen as one that exceeds the eponymous song itself; That is, the context of the visual narrative semantically overpowers the meaning of the song.

In contrast, music videos that aren't formally organized may have no segmentation markings that flow with the lyrics and contain abstract images. The music video for Peter Gabriel's song "Sledgehammer" is an example of a formally unorganized music video.

Generally music videos can be said to contain visuals that either represent the potential connotative meaning of the lyrics or a semiotic system of its own. Although many analysts would explain a music video as a narrative structure, there are many videos that defy narrative conventions.

== Intertextuality ==
Intertextuality, for media purposes, references other popular culture objects within their video, and then the audience creates their meaning of the video according to the intentional suggestion created with relationships between primary and secondary texts. In general terms, intertextuality is considered links within a context or medium that bind text to other text (Chandler, pp. 166, 2007 ). Many editors and directors use intertextuality in music videos because it combines different cultural codes taken from previous texts that are sensible for many audiences. Using intertextuality in music videos allow a viewer to identify with their theoretical framework of knowledge, and use it to define their identity. This approach can be used to gain popularity for referenced ideas, and influence consumers with a persuasive agenda. Material Girl, by Madonna is an example of using intertextuality because she is acting like Marilyn Monroe in Diamonds are a Girl's Best Friend. This is a direct cinematic reference which allows an active audience to draw conclusions to the meaning of the message.

== Intratextuality ==
Intratextuality is a term that is derived from intertextuality, but is considered combining secondary references for marketing and promotional purposes. This type of technique is also called anchorage, found by Roland Barthes: anchoring text to a context that changes the intentional meaning. An example of this would be, the music video, Right Now, by Van Halen. The lyrics of the song Right Now suggest an entirely different meaning than the social empowering messages shown through the music video.

== Bricolage ==
Bricolage is also an example of using many different texts within a context for promotional, marketing, or popularity value. Lady Gaga uses cultural bricolage in her music videos by using fashion and previous memorable characteristics of former pop stars. Michael Jackson's Leave Me Alone is also a form of bricolage because it is a collage of already popular people and pop culture artifacts combined to portray his own message.

== See also ==
- Film semiotics
- Musical semiotics
