= Semiotics of fashion =

Study of fashion signifiers in society

The semiotics of fashion is the study of fashion and how humans signify specific social and cultural positions through dress. The semiotics of dress is the study of design and customs associated with clothing, as patterned to a kind of symbolism that has rules and norms. It describes how people use clothing and adornments to signify various cultural and societal positions.

== Semiotics ==
Ferdinand de Saussure defined semiotics as "the science of the life of signs in society". Semiotics is the study of signs and just as we can interpret signs and construct meaning from text we can also construct meaning from visual images such as fashion. Fashion is a language of signs that non-verbally converse meanings about individuals and groups. It holds a symbolic and communicative role having the capacity to express one's unique style, identity, profession, social status, and gender or group affiliation.

"Semiotics" is defined as the philosophical study and interpretation of signs. The semiotic system is not limited to just verbal communication. Therefore, the term "semiotics of dress" can be further referred to as a non-linguistic semiotic resource which interrelates with facial expressions, gestures and body semiotics in an effort to develop and communicate meaning. People develop meaning of signs and signals based on an individual and personal ideology.

== Clothing and fashion ==
Clothing is defined as "any covering of the human body", while fashion is defined as the style of dress accepted by members of a society as being appropriate for specific times and occasions. The human body is the key element of this non-linguistic semiotic resource. The way one dresses is informed by the biological and social needs of the individual. Central to the semiotics of dress is the psychology of self-perception and self-presentation, both as individuals who see themselves, as well as how individuals are seen within a greater group, society, culture or subculture.

== Social views ==
When the term semiotics is applied to dress, it refers to the words and symbols used to describe the images supporting "the structure of social interaction". Examples of these social interactions include: the system of statuses and roles. Therefore, the way one dresses can be analyzed as a symbol mechanism to communicate ideas and values with other members in a society, as sociologists Erving Goffman and Gregory P. Stone have suggested.

Clothing is a visual signifier that can be interpreted differently based especially on context and culture. Fred Davis expressed the difficulty of understanding and interpreting clothing and fashion. Davis explained that the difficulty is increased because similar expressive elements frequently have substantial differences in symbolic influence based on geographic and demographic differences."

=== Symbolism/ideals/values of dress ===
Ruth Rubinstein, a sociologist and author, identified six distinct categories of dress.

1. "Clothing symbols," have several meanings and involve individual choice and preference. Name brand athletic wear is an example.
2. "Clothing tie-signs," are specific types of clothing that indicate membership in a community outside of mainstream culture. Amish and Hutterite attire are examples.
3. "Clothing tie-symbols," act as a means of broader social affiliation emanating especially from fears, hopes, and dreams. This can include Save the Earth clothing, Pro-Choice T-shirts, and religious crosses.
4. "Personal dress," refers to the "I" component we bring in when dressing the public self. This category allows for individuality in the public sphere.
5. "Contemporary fashion," is the interaction between political and economic events and consumer sentiments, involving public memory.
6. "Clothing signs," is the sixth category, and is made up of three sub-categories. The first, is task oriented or instrumental in nature; the second, is having one primary meaning; and the third, is being recognized as a sign for those who wear it.

Clothing that shows or portrays some kind of authority in society would fall in the first category. An example would be military uniforms, wigs used in English courts, law enforcement uniforms, clerical collars, or the trademark white labcoat of a medical doctor. People who wear these kinds of clothing are expected by society to behave in certain ways. Not only that, but it is assumed that they possess certain economic, educational and social statuses.

Clothing that separates the sexes, and creates differences between a male and a female, would fall into the second category of clothing signs according to Rubinstin. Sex differences in clothing are due to "Social judgments, personal evaluation and appropriate expectations of dress". Because of these, society has coercive power upon colors, shapes and fabrics in the clothes that men and women should wear. Men would wear pants while women would wear skirts, for example.

Within the third category one may find "seductive attire" as it was labeled by Flugel. However, wearing sex-specific clothing doesn't necessarily mean one will feel sensual or inclined to have sexual intercourse. The church fathers said seductive attire is a mixture of exposure and coverage of the body. A clothing piece one may use for reference is the décolletage, which was "first in use during the end of the Middle Ages".

Symbolism in clothing or dress is subjective, unlike clothing signs. Symbols in clothing don't represent one's level in a social institution. Therefore, they are not governed by any kind of rules or regulations. Clothing symbols are a reflection of what a specific society believes is valuable at a given time. Clothing symbols do not offer implications about a person's rights, duties or obligations, and they should not be used to judge or predict one's behavior. Therefore, an intimate comprehension of an individual's history as well as time investment is required to understand and comprehend an individual through clothing symbols. Some examples that show how malleable clothing symbols are the alternative use for military clothing during the 1960's. During the Vietnam War, members of anti-war movements wore fatigue jackets to oppose the war. Those taking part in the hippie movement adopted large military coats adorned with peace signs as their own form of protest. On the other hand, military parkas and coats were embraced by Mods for their practicality and by punks for their grunge aesthetic. These are examples of how the symbol or meaning of an article of clothing can change over time and be adapted in a manner different than the clothing item's intended use.

Cultural values in dress can easily increase an individual's self-significance by portraying those good, desirable values in accordance with one's society. This can be further explained by looking at or taking members of the European aristocracy as an example. They would wear clothes made with expensive fabrics and ornaments, which would differentiate them from the rest. All in efforts to show others that they possess a privileged place in a social class, where they could not be seen working in a field. Therefore, giving the impression of freedom and relaxation from harsh labor, unlike their servants. Cultural dress has the ability to disclose information about intimate aspects of our lives and relationships.It also projects perceptions about class.

=== Gender ===
Throughout history there has been a separation between the roles and relationships that men and women play. These socially structured differences between men and women have contradicted each other at times. Fashion has picked up on the tensions left by these contradictions as well. The symbolic separation of men and women is fundamental to the history of dress. As time has gone by, the forms of clothing (colors, fabrics and shapes) have changed, but the idea of gender difference has survived. From an early point in life, children learn to differentiate between a male and a female based on clothing and hairstyles. An example this may be attributed to is television cartoons where superheroines are pictured with strong and muscular bodies. However; due to their clothing, they portray an image or an idea to the viewer of being sexy or attractive, therefore putting her physical strength as a secondary attribute.

Historically, fashion has been used to differentiate gender to reinforce societal norms of gender polarization. Although both men's and women's attire evolved over time and differ from culture to culture, men's attire is rooted in social class and functionality, treating their clothes as non-signifying necessities, while women's fashion evolved into a complex semiotic language system. Traditional women's clothing tends to allow for more self-expression because of societal expectations in regard to varying use of silhouettes, ornaments, fabrics, and colors that are not as varied in men's attire, operating as a language that communicates self-expression and society. Visual language in clothing exists outside of fashion as well.

School uniforms are an example outside of fashion that the influence of societal norms has historically marked. In the Victorian era, it was common for boys to sport bum freezer jackets, gray trousers, starched white collars, and a top hat. This uniform mainly conveyed the social standing of the student, as blue jackets would be worn by students of lower social standing due to the cheapness of the blue dye. In contrast, high social class students would have other colored jackets. On the other hand, girls would wear stretch jerseys, loose blouses, and knee-length skirts, restricting their abilities to do any physical sport or exercise, which reinforced societal norms that women were not allowed to participate in sports. The overall concept of school uniforms remains the same, with schools with uniform policies requiring boys to wear collared shirts and trousers and girls to wear blouses and skirts. However, there have been recent arguments against institutions that challenge the binary gendered notion of uniforms to allow for accommodations for students who fall in between the spectrum of gender identity. An example of this would be in 2016 when gender-neutral categories of uniforms were implemented in the United Kingdom for students who are transitioning.

== Clothing as a non-verbal sign ==
Clothing is a non-verbal sign that can be interpreted differently depending on the context, situation or culture. It's in this way that the semiotics of fashion can be linked to social semiotics. According to Fred Davis, " The chief difficulty of understanding fashion in its apparent vagaries is the lack of exact knowledge of the unconscious symbolisms attaching to forms, colors, textures, postures, and other expressive elements of a given cultures. The difficulty is increased by the fact that some of the expressive elements tend to have quite different symbolic references in different areas. " The meanings that are constructed through fashion largely depend on culturally accepted codes. This can be demonstrated in the choice of color for wedding ceremonies across different cultures. For example, a white dress is the traditional attire for a wedding ceremony in contemporary western culture; however in many Asian cultures the color white is associated with death and would be more appropriately worn at a funeral.

=== Dress codes ===
Specific dress codes are identified by individuals within a culture and convey a message to help categorize and create meaning. A uniform is a specific type of clothing that is worn to associate that person with an organization, trade or rank. Uniforms are symbolic and their meanings are arbitrary, in that they stand for their referent based upon agreement or habit of individuals within that culture. In western society a policeman will typically wear variations of a blue suit and this generally symbolizes law, security, and authority. Doctors wear white lab coats to represent their profession in health and also to suggest sanitation. Nuns wear black and white dresses that associate them with their involvement in religion.

=== Fashion ===
Fashion can go beyond symbolizing a profession, it can also communicate ideas about an individual's personality, social status, or religious belonging. The Burka is a head covering worn by Islamic women and signifies their belonging to an Islamic society. Brand name jeans and designer label garments are worn by individuals to represent value or status in a society. Desmond Morris states, "It is impossible to wear clothes without transmitting social signals."

Roland Barthes was a semiotician, who studied the fashion system and how ideologies are transmitted through dress. The semiotic system is formed by social interests and ideologies, and the fashion system is no different. In our society the ideologies in fashion are often implemented by celebrities or the dominant class. Jackie Kennedy was an important style icon for American women during the 1960s, where her style became a symbol of wealth, power and prestige .

The fashion system is not static, and as society and social interests change, so do trends and styles in dress. For example, pants were originally a garment worn by men and signified masculinity, but society evolved and pants became an acceptable garment for both men and women. Pants are no longer confined to signifying masculinity. Society changes and as individuals in that society adapt so do their dress codes and fashion choices. Fashion is a system of signs, whose meanings and significations are constantly shifting and changing depending on the time, place, and culture.

== Psychology in dress ==
Psychologist J. C. Flugel concluded that styles of dress affect one's appearance, yet triggering feelings that enable role performance. This means that when an individual's body and clothes fuse together to form one, the individual's sense of importance increases. Increments in one's sense of importance yields to feelings and behaviors of being able to control the environment in which one is in. At the same time, this may work backwards. In other words, if one's body and clothes don't come together as a whole, then one may feel embarrassed, and therefore belittle its sense of importance. Flugel called this idea Image Contrast.

Articles of clothing that are believed to give authority, power, status, or ability over a certain task have proven cognitive consequences for the individual wearing them. In a study done at Northwest University, researchers were able to confirm that clothes influence the wearer's psychological processes if the wearer was wearing the garment and if they believed that the garment held significance. The study consisted of three experiments with 38 people associating lab coats with doctors and did tests on selective attention and sustained attention. Additionally, a 2015 study by researchers from multiple universities found that wearing formal clothing enhanced abstract cognitive processing mediated by the wearer's increasing feeling of power. The study of five experiments held that the clothing one wears changes the way we see ourselves and possibly influences our decision-making, communication skills, and leadership behavior.

Clothing can be perceived as one's medium or channel for self-expression. Every day people communicate ideas and express feelings about them to others through the use of clothing, and vice versa. This way of thinking leads to the idea of the social self, which is that the idea of self-reflection is a social construction.

=== Self-perception ===
The term self-schema could be used to defined thought processes that modify, organize and integrate qualities assigned to the self. This idea may include visual images or verbal descriptions that people may use to describe which "look" suits them best and which "look" doesn't.

Teen boys see themselves as more physically effective than teen girls. While at the same time, teen girls perceive themselves as being more effective by means of attractiveness. Recently these perceptions among men and women have changed. Women are increasingly concerned with their physical effectiveness, while men have become more interested in their physical attractiveness. Today, unlike men, women are more critical when assessing their bodies in terms of physical fitness, appearance, health and sexuality. However, both men and women tend to be equally satisfied when it comes to their bodies and their self-perceptions.

== See also ==
- Alison Lurie
- Dress code
- Sumptuary laws
- Wardrobe malfunction
