= Film semiotics =

Sign study in film

Film semiotics is the study of sign process (semiosis), or any form of activity, conduct, or any process that involves signs, including the production of meaning, as these signs pertain to moving pictures. Film semiotics is used for the interpretation of many art forms, often including abstract art.

== Early semioticians of film ==
- Ricciotto Canudo – Italian writer working in the 1920s, identified “language-like character of cinema”.
- Louis Delluc – French writer, working in the 1920s, wrote of the ability of film to transcend national language.
- Vachel Lindsay – referred to film as “hieroglyphic language”.
- Béla Balázs – Hungarian film theorist who wrote about language-like nature of film from the 1920s to the 1940s.

== Russian formalism (1910s–1930s) ==
Yury Tynyanov was a Russian writer and literary critic. Boris Eichenbaum outlined principles of syntagmatic construction. Syntagmatic analysis deals with sequence and structure, as opposed to the paradigm emphasis of paradigmatic analysis. The cinema, for Eichenbaum, is a “particular of figurative language,” the stylistics of which would treat filmic “syntax,” the linkage of shots in “phrases” and “sentences.”

Russian formalists Eichenbaum and Tynyanov had two different approaches to interpreting the signs of film. "Tynyanov spoke of the cinema as offering the visible world in the form of semantic signs engendered by cinematic procedures such as lighting and montage, while Eichenbaum saw film in relation to "inner speech" and "image translations of linguistic tropes."

== Structuralism and post-structuralism (1950s–present) ==
The film-language concept was explored more deeply in the 1960s when post-structuralist thinkers started to criticize structuralism. Also, semiotics became popular in academia. Early work in this field dealt with “contrasting arbitrary signs of natural language with the motivated, iconic signs of the cinema”.

- Umberto Eco – Italian novelist and semiotician
- Juri Lotman – Estonian semiotician of culture
- Pier Paolo Pasolini – Italian director and writer
- Christian Metz – French film theorist
- Roland Barthes – French literary theorist

== Concepts ==
Denotation and connotation

Film communicates meaning denotatively and connotatively. What the audience sees and hears is denotative (represented in the mise-en-scène); it simply represents itself. At the same time, these sounds and images are connotative; the way the scene or image is shot is meant to evoke certain feelings from the viewer. Connotation typically involves emotional overtones, objective interpretation, social values, and ideological assumptions. According to Christian Metz, “The study of connotation brings us closer to the notion of the cinema as an art (the “seventh art”).” Within connotations, paradigmatic connotations exist, which would be a shot that is being compared with its unrealized companions in the paradigm. A low angle shot of a rose conveys a sense that the flower is somehow dominant or overpowering because we unconsciously compare it with an overhead shot of a rose which would diminish its importance. Syntagmatic connotation would not compare the rose shot to other potential shots but compare it with actual shots that precede or follow it. The meaning adheres to it because its compared to other shots we actually see.

Narrative

Narrative is generally known as having two components: the story presented and the process of telling it, or narration, often referred to as narrative discourse. Film narrative theory seeks to uncover the apparently “motivated” and “natural” relationship between the signifier and the story-world in order to reveal the deeper system of cultural associations and relationships that are expressed through narrative form. As Roland Barthes has said, “narrative may be transmitted through oral or written language; through static or moving images, through gestures and through an organized mixture of all these substances. There is narrative in myth, legend, fables, fairytales, novellas, novels, history, novel, epos, tragedy, drama, comedy, pantomime, pictures, comics, events and conversation. In these unlimited forms, narrative exists at all times, in all corners of the earth, in all societies. Narrative begins with the history of mankind.” Films use a combination of dialog, sounds, visual images, gestures and actions to create the narrative. Narrators, usually in a voice-over format, are very popular in documentary film and greatly assist in telling the story while accompanying powerful shots.

Tropes

Metonymy refers to the ability of a sign to represent something entirely, while literally only being a part of it. An example of this is the Eiffel Tower, which is a metonym for Paris. Film uses metonyms frequently because they rely on the external to reveal the internal. Another powerful semiotic tool for filmmaking is the use of metaphors, which are defined as a comparison between two things that are unrelated but share some common characteristics. In film, a pair of consecutive shots is metaphorical when there is an implied comparison of the two shots. For instance, a shot of an airplane followed by a shot of a bird flying would be metaphorical, implying that the airplane is (or is like) a bird.

== Notable works ==
=== Umberto Eco (1968) ===
Umberto Eco, "Articulations of The Cinematic Code" (1976)—"Sulle articolazioni del codice cinematografico" (1968):
Umberto Eco’s research dealt with the semiology of visual codes using the work of Metz and Pier Paolo Pasolini as a starting point. Film semiotics was born in a series of memorable debates among Eco, Metz and Pasolini at the Mostra Internazionale del Nuovo Cinema in Pesaro from 1965 to 1967.

Eco viewed the task of semiology as important and radical. “Semiology shows us the universe of ideologies, arranged in codes and sub-codes, within the universe of signs, and these ideologies are reflected in our preconstituted ways of using the language.”

Triple articulation codes consist of figures, signs and elements. Eco assumed that the cinematic codes are the only ones using triple articulation. Where current linguistic conventions might use two axes, the paradigmatic and the syntagmatic, the triple articulation can use kinesics to identify discrete units of time. Articulations are introduced into a code to communicate the maximum number of combinable elements. Because we normally experience non-articulated and double-articulated codes, running across a code with triple articulation can be overwhelming. “The contextual wealth of this combination makes the cinema a richer form of communication than speech.”

Summary of codes

- Perceptive codes
- Codes of recognition
- Codes of transmission
- Tonal codes
- Iconic codes (figures, signs and semes)
- Iconographic codes
- Codes of taste and sensibility
- Rhetorical codes
- Stylistic codes
- Codes of the unconscious

=== Christian Metz (1968) ===
Christian Metz, Film Language: A Semiotics of Cinema (1974)—Essais sur la signification au cinéma (1968):
This collection of Metz’s writings on cinematographic problems was informed by insights from structural linguistics. “The study of the cinema as an art – the study of cinematographic expressiveness – can therefore be conducted according to methods derived from linguistics...through its procedures of denotation, the cinema is a specific language.”

=== Gilles Deleuze (1983–85) ===
Gilles Deleuze, Cinéma 1. L'Image-Mouvement—Cinema 1: The Movement Image (1983) and Cinéma 2, L'Image-Temps—Cinema 2: The Time-Image (1985):
A work in which the author combines philosophy with film criticism.

=== Robert Stam, Robert Burgoyne, and Sandy Flitterman-Lewis (1992) ===
Robert Stam, Robert Burgoyne, and Sandy Flitterman-Lewis, New Vocabularies in Film Semiotics: Structuralism, Post-structuralism, and Beyond (1992):
This work highlighted film semiotics as a new tool in art criticism. The book provided an overview of previous thinkers and defined terms critical to semiotic film theory. “This book is intended as a didactic introduction to the vocabulary of the field, not as a series of interventions in film theory”

Part One: The Origins of Semiotics

Semiotics must be viewed through the broader context of the linguistic nature of contemporary thought. "The overarching meta-discipline of semiotics...can be seen as a local manifestation of a more widespread "linguistic turn," an attempt to reconceptualize the world "through" linguistics."

Part Two: Cine-semiology

Dealt with the cinematic sign, The Grand Syntagmatic, textual systems and analysis, semiotics of filmic sound, language in the cinema.

Part Three: Film-narratology

Taking cues from structuralism and Russian Formalism, film narrative theory attempts to "designate the basic structures of story processes and to define the aesthetic languages unique to film narrative discourse."

Part Four: Psychoanalysis

The relationship between human psyche and cinematic representation is explored. "One of the aims, therefore, of psychoanalytic film theory is a systematic comparison of the cinema as a specific kind of spectacle and the structure of the socially and psychically constituted individual."

Part Five: From realism to intertextuality

Describes the evolution from an emphasis on realism in the 1950s to the intertextuality of the 1970s.

== See also ==
- Semiotics of music videos
- Apparatus theory
