= Semiotics =

Study of signs

Semiotics (Note: Pronunciation: /sɛmɪˈɒtɪks/, /siːmɪˈɒtɪks/) is the study of signs. It is an interdisciplinary field that examines what signs are, how they form sign systems, and how individuals use signs to produce and communicate meaning. Semiotics is usually divided into syntactics, which addresses how signs are organized and combined; semantics, which addresses the relation between signs and their meanings; and pragmatics, which addresses the relation between signs and their users. Semiotics is related to linguistics but has a broader scope that includes nonlinguistic signs, such as maps and clothing.

Signs are things that stand for something else, such as the word cat, which stands for a carnivorous mammal. They can take many physical forms, called sign vehicles, such as sounds, images, written marks, and gestures. Icons are signs that communicate meaning through qualitative resemblance to their referents, such as a portrait of a person. Indexical signs are based on a direct physical link, such as smoke as a sign of fire. For symbolic signs, the relation between sign vehicle and referent is conventional or arbitrary, which applies to most linguistic signs. Models of signs analyze their basic components. Ferdinand de Saussure's dyadic model identifies a perceptible image and a concept as the core elements, whereas Charles Sanders Peirce's triadic model distinguishes a sign vehicle, a referent, and an effect in the interpreter's mind.

Sign systems are structured networks of interrelated signs, such as the English language. Semioticians study how signs combine to form larger units of meaning, called texts. They explore how the text's message depends on the meanings of its signs and how contextual factors and tropes influence this process. They also investigate the codes employed to communicate meaning, including conventional codes, such as the color code of traffic signals, and natural codes, such as DNA encoding hereditary information.

Semiotics has diverse applications because of the pervasive nature of signs. Many semioticians study cultural products, such as literature, art, and media, investigating both the elements used to express meaning and the subtle ideological messages they convey. The psychological activities associated with sign use are another research topic. Biosemiotics extends the scope of inquiry beyond human communication, examining sign processes within and between animals, plants, and other organisms. Because semiotics spans many disciplines, no single methodology is used across all of its subfields. Although the roots of semiotic research lie in antiquity, it was not until the late 19th and early 20th centuries that semiotics emerged as an independent field of inquiry through the work of Peirce and Saussure.

== Definitions and related fields ==
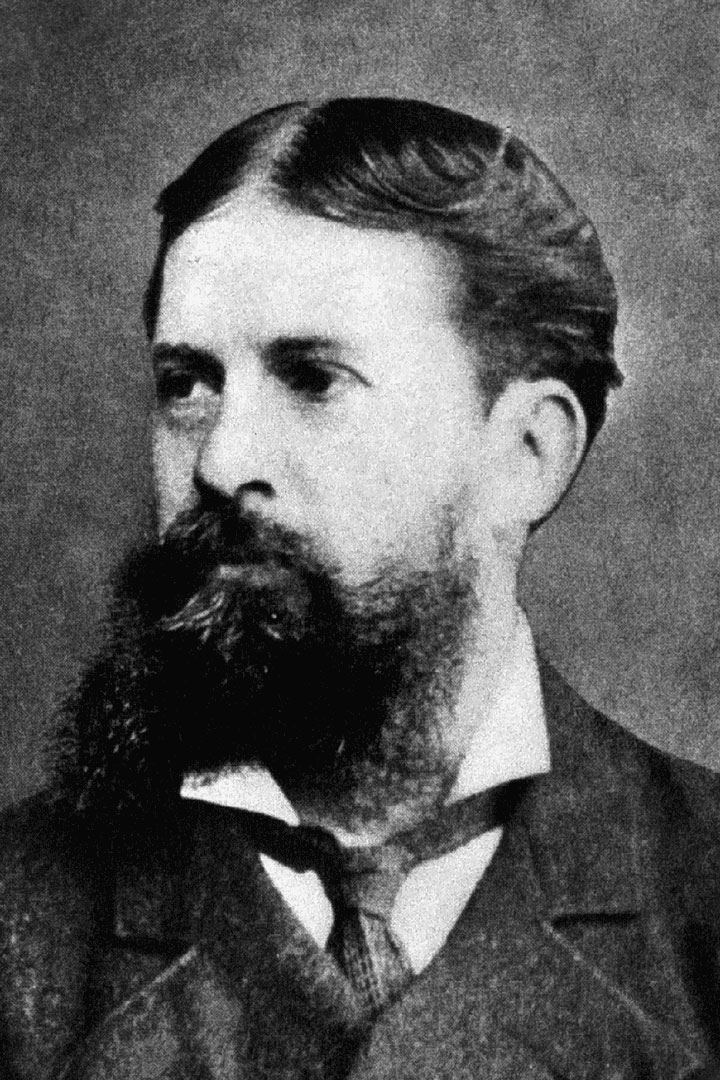
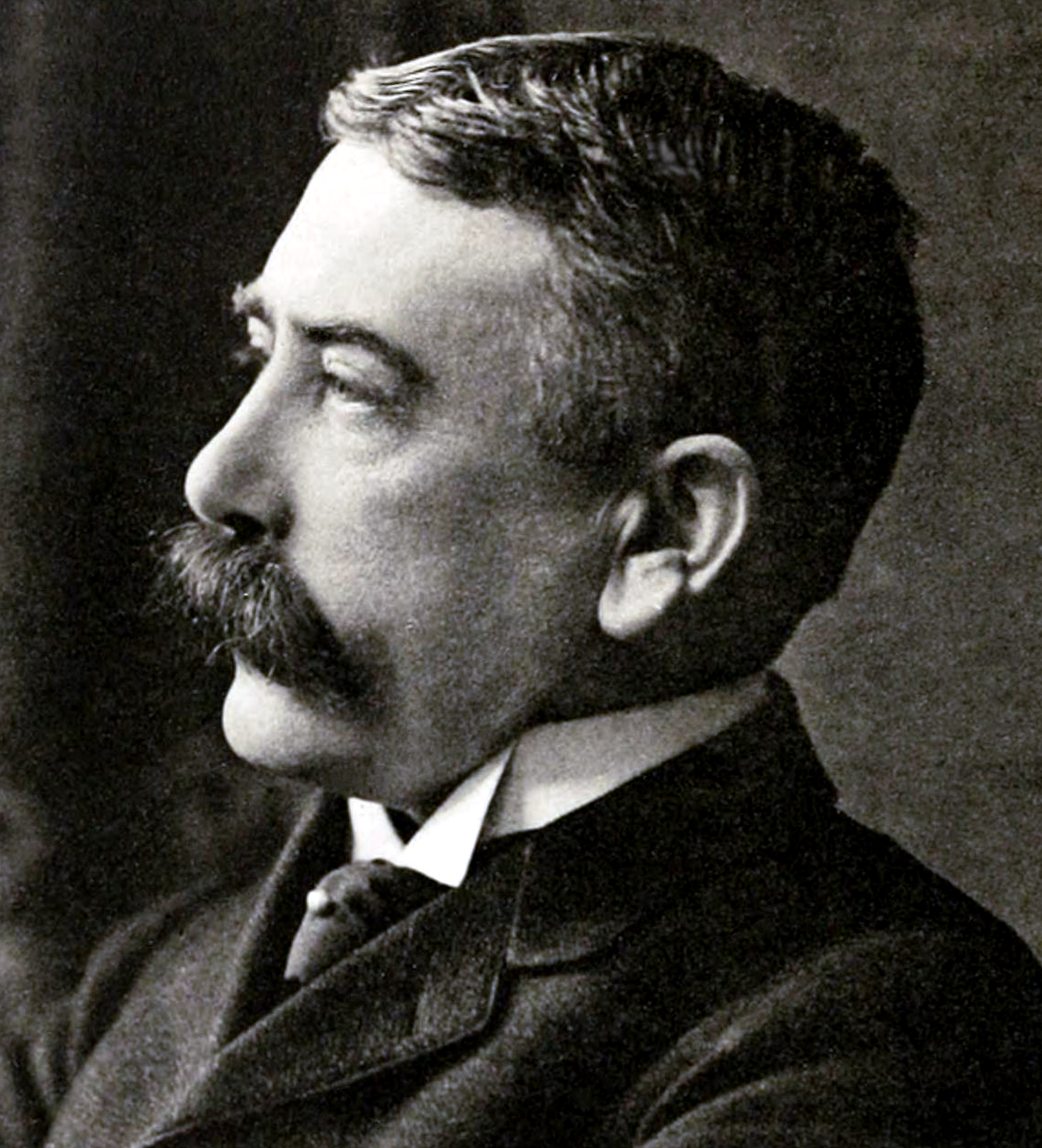
Charles Sanders Peirce (left) and Ferdinand de Saussure helped establish semiotics as a distinct field of inquiry.

Semiotics is the study of signs or of how meaning is created and communicated through them. Also called semiology, (Note: It is controversial whether they are exact synonyms. For example, semiology is sometimes understood as a subfield of semiotics that focuses on linguistic signs. Less common synonyms of semiotics include significs and signology.) it examines the nature of signs, their organization into sign systems (such as language), and the ways individuals interpret and use them. Semiotics has wide-reaching applications because of the pervasive nature of signs, affecting how individuals experience phenomena, communicate ideas, and interact with their environment.

These applications make it an interdisciplinary field, originating in philosophy and linguistics and closely related to disciplines such as psychology, anthropology, sociology, and education sciences. Because most sciences rely on sign processes in some form, semiotics is sometimes characterized as a meta-discipline that provides a general approach for the analysis of signs across domains. Whether semiotics is itself a science is controversial, since there are no universally accepted theoretical assumptions or methods on which semioticians agree. Semiotics has been characterized variously as a theory, a doctrine, a movement, or a discipline. It is typically divided into three branches: semantics, syntactics, and pragmatics, which study how signs relate to their meanings, to one another, and to their users, respectively.

Semiotic inquiry overlaps with linguistics and communication theory. Like linguistics, it is concerned with the analysis of sign systems, examining the meanings of words, how they are combined to form sentences, and how they convey messages in concrete contexts. A key difference is that linguistics focuses on language, while semiotics also studies nonlinguistic signs, such as images, gestures, traffic signs, and animal calls. Communication theory examines how individuals encode, convey, and interpret both linguistic and nonlinguistic messages. It typically focuses on technical aspects of message transmission, usually between distinct organisms. Semiotics, by contrast, is concerned more broadly with meaning and meaning-making, including signs that do not involve intentional communication. (Note: The exact distinction between semiotics and communication theory is disputed. According to some proposals, they have the same scope, arguing that all semiotic activity is communicative.) For example, semioticians study naturally occurring biological signs, such as disease symptoms, and signs based on inanimate relations, such as smoke as a sign of fire.

The term semiotics derives from the Greek word σημειωτική (sēmeiōtikē), originally associated with the study of disease symptoms. The philosopher John Locke proposed the Greek term as the name for a new field of inquiry concerned with signs in his 1690 book An Essay Concerning Human Understanding. The first use of the English term semiotics dates to the 1670s. Semiotics became a distinct field of inquiry through the work of the philosopher Charles Sanders Peirce and the linguist Ferdinand de Saussure, who are regarded as its founders.

== Signs ==
A sign is an entity that stands for something else. For example, the word cat is a sign that stands for a carnivorous mammal. Signs direct the attention of interpreters away from themselves and toward the entities they represent. They can take many forms, such as words, images, sounds, and odors. Signs can refer to diverse types of entities, including physical objects, events, places, psychological feelings, and abstract ideas. They help people recognize patterns, make plans, predict outcomes, convey ideas, and understand the world.

Semioticians distinguish different elements of signs. The sign vehicle is the physical form that a sign takes, such as sound waves in spoken language or printed letters on a page, whereas the referent is the object it stands for. The precise number and nature of these elements are disputed, and different models of signs propose distinct analyses. The referent of a sign can itself be a sign, leading to a chain of signification. For instance, the expression red rose is a sign for a type of flower, which can itself act as a sign of love.

Semiosis is the activity or capacity of comprehending and producing signs. Also characterized as the action of signs, it involves the interplay between sign vehicle and referent as organisms interpret meaning within a given context. Different types of semiosis are distinguished by the type of organisms engaging in the sign activity, such as the contrast between anthroposemiosis involving humans, zoosemiosis involving other animals, and phytosemiosis involving plants.

=== Meaning, sense, and reference ===
The meaning of a sign is what semiosis generates. Meaning is typically analyzed into two aspects: sense and reference. (Note: Narrow definitions of meaning identify it with sense and contrast it with reference. Terminologically, the distinction comes from a translation of a work of Gottlob Frege, who used the German terms Sinn and Bedeutung.) The terms connotation and denotation, as well as intension and extension, are also sometimes used for this distinction. The reference of a sign is the object for which it stands and the sense of a sign is the way in which that object is identified or presented. For example, when the terms morning star and evening star are used for the planet Venus, they have the same reference but different senses: morning star identifies Venus as an object visible in the morning, while evening star identifies it as an object visible in the evening. Thus, two signs can refer to the same object while differing in meaning because they present that object in different ways.

Various theories of meaning explain its nature and the conditions that determine the meanings of signs. Referential theories focus on the referential function of meaning, for instance, by characterizing meaning as the signified object or as a context-dependent function that points to objects. Ideational or mentalist theories interpret the meaning of a sign in relation to the mental states of sign users, for example, as the ideas it evokes. Pragmatic theories describe meaning based on behavioral responses and use conditions. (Note: For example, Ludwig Wittgenstein argued that language is similar to a game and that the meaning of linguistic expressions is typically connected to how they are used based on the rules and conventions governing their application in a language game.)

=== Types and sign relations ===
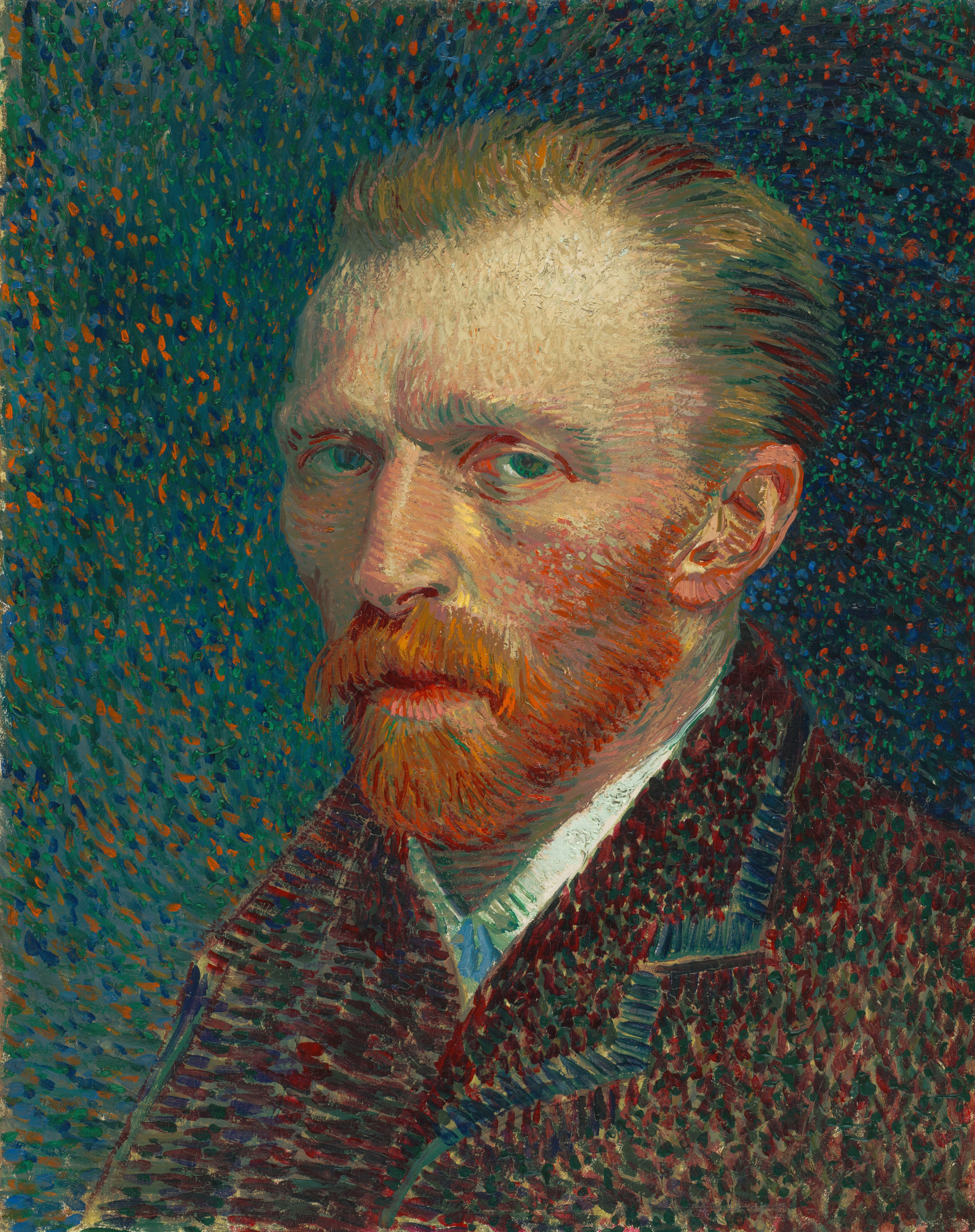
Icons represent through similarity, such as a portrait referring to Vincent van Gogh by resembling him.

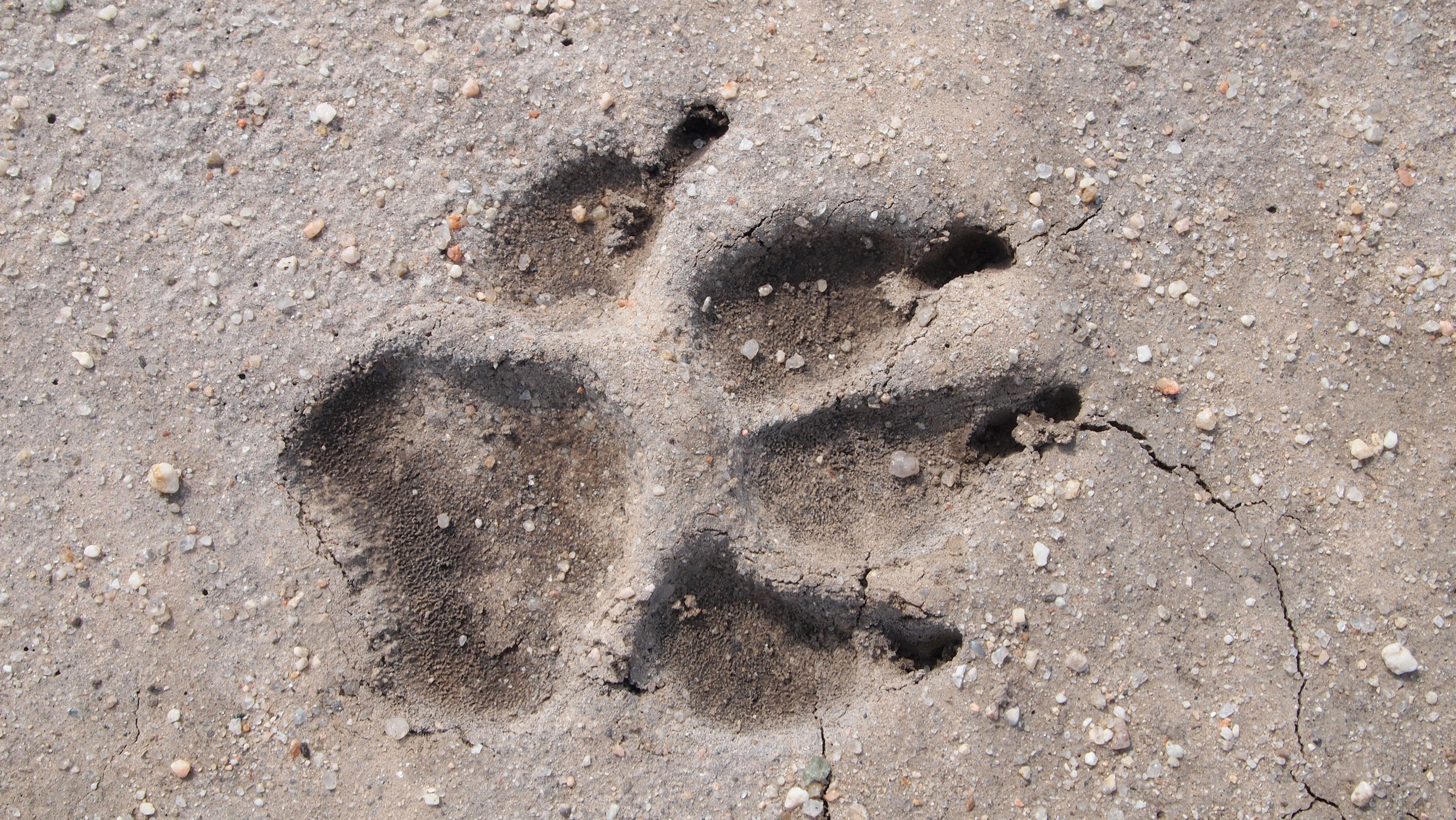
Indexical signs represent through a direct physical link, such as a footprint of a dog referring to the dog.

Symbols are signs with an arbitrary relation between sign vehicle and referent, such as the link between the word apple and the fruit.

Semioticians distinguish various types of signs, often based on the sign relation or how the sign vehicle is connected to the referent. A historically influential classification distinguishes between conventional and natural signs. Conventional signs depend on culturally established norms and intentionality to establish the link between sign vehicle and referent. For example, the meaning of the term tree is fixed by social conventions associated with the English language rather than a natural connection between the term and trees. Natural signs, by contrast, are based on a substantial link other than conventions, as when the footprint of a bear signifies the bear's presence because the bear's body physically produced it, not because of any convention. In modern semiotics, however, the distinction between natural and conventional signs has become less central as many theorists adopted the threefold classification into icons, indices, and symbols proposed by Peirce.

Icons are signs that operate through similarity: the sign vehicle resembles or imitates its referent. This includes direct physical resemblance, as in a lifelike portrait, but also more abstract resemblance, as in metaphors and diagrams. Icons are also used in animal communication: ants of the species Pogonomyrmex badius, for example, use a smell-based warning signal whose intensity and duration resemble the intensity and duration of the danger.

Indices are signs that operate through a direct physical link. Typically, the referent is the cause of the sign vehicle. For example, smoke indicates the presence of fire because it is a physical effect produced by the fire itself. Similarly, disease symptoms are signs of the disease causing them, and a thermometer's gauge reading indicates the temperature responsible. Other material links besides a direct cause-effect relation are also possible, such as a directional signpost physically pointing the path to a nearby campsite.

Symbols are signs that operate through convention-based associations. For them, the relation between sign vehicle and referent is arbitrary. (Note: This is the case for most linguistic signs. Onomatopoeic expressions are exceptions that rely on similarity through phonetic imitation, including expressions for animal sounds such as moo (cow) and woof-woof (dog).) It arises from social agreements, which an individual needs to learn to decode the meaning. Examples are the numeral "2", the colors on traffic lights, and national flags.

The categories of icon, index, and symbol are not mutually exclusive, and the same sign may belong to more than one. For example, some road warning signs combine iconic elements, like an image of falling rocks to indicate a rockslide, with symbolic elements, such as a red triangle to signal danger. Various other categories are discussed in the academic literature. Semiotician Thomas Sebeok expands the icon-index-symbol classification by adding three more categories: signals are signs that typically trigger behavioral responses in the receiver; symptoms are automatic, non-arbitrary signs; and names are extensional signs that identify one specific individual. Other categorizations of signs are based on the channel of transmission, vagueness, ambiguity, reliability, complexity, type of referent, and whether they are intentionally produced.

=== Models ===
Models of signs seek to identify the essential components of signs. Many models have been proposed, and most introduce a unique terminology for the different components, although they often share substantial conceptual overlap. A common classification distinguishes between dyadic and triadic models.

According to Saussure's dyadic model, signs are composed of a sensible image (signifier) and a concept (signified). The arrows illustrate the interaction between the two components.

Dyadic models assert that signs have essentially two components: a sign vehicle and its meaning. An influential dyadic model was proposed by Saussure, who names the components signifier and signified. The signifier is a sensible image, whereas the signified is a concept or an idea associated with this form. For Saussure, the sign is a relation that connects signifier and signified, functioning as a bridge from a sensory form to a concept. He understands both signifier and signified as psychological elements that exist in the minds of language users. As a result, the meaning of signs is limited to the realm of ideas and does not directly refer to external objects. Focusing on language as a general model of signs, Saussure argued that the relation between signifier and signified is arbitrary, meaning that any sensible image could in principle be paired with any concept. He held that individual signs need to be understood in the context of sign systems, which organize and regulate the arbitrary connections.

Various interpreters of Saussure's model, such as the linguists Louis Hjelmslev (Note: Inspired by Saussure, Hjelmslev proposed a sign model based on four categories. He argued that a sign consists of an expression and a content—corresponding to Saussure's signifier and signified—and added that expression and content each have two aspects: substance and form.) and Roman Jakobson, rejected the purely psychological interpretation of signs. For them, signifiers are material forms that can be seen or heard, not mental images of material forms. Similarly, critics have objected to the idea that the relations between signs and signifiers are always arbitrary, pointing to iconic and indexical signs as counterexamples. (Note: It is controversial whether this criticism is successful since iconic and indexical signs concern relations to external referents, whereas Saussure's model deals with relations between ideas.)

According to Peirce's triadic model, signs are composed of a sign vehicle (representamen), a referent (object), and an effect in the interpreter's mind (interpretant).

Triadic models assert that signs have three components. An influential triadic model proposed by Peirce argues that a third component is required to account for the individual that interprets signs, implying that there is no meaning without interpretation. According to Peirce, a sign is a relation between a representamen, an object, and an interpretant. The representamen is a perceptible entity, the object is the referent for which the representamen stands, and the interpretant is the effect produced in the mind of the interpreter.

Peirce distinguishes various aspects of these components. The immediate object is the object as the sign presents it—a mental representation. The dynamic object, by contrast, is the entity as it actually is, which anchors the sign's meaning. The immediate interpretant is the sign's potential meaning, whereas the dynamic interpretant is its actual effect, or the understanding it produces. The final interpretant is the ideal meaning that would be reached after an exhaustive inquiry. Peirce emphasizes that semiosis, or meaning-making, is a continuously evolving process. Analyzing Peirce's model, Umberto Eco speaks of an "unlimited semiosis", in which the interpretation of one sign leads to further signs, producing an endless chain of signification.

Another triadic model, proposed by Charles Kay Ogden and I. A. Richards, distinguishes between symbol, thought, and referent. Known as the semiotic triangle, it holds that the connection between symbol and referent is not direct but requires the mediation of thought to establish the link.

== Sign systems ==
A sign system is a complex of relations governing how signs are formed, combined, and interpreted, such as a specific language. Signs usually occur in the context of a sign system, and some semiotic theories assert that the meaning of a sign depends on its position within a network of signs and cannot be understood in isolation of it.

=== Sign elements and texts ===
Sign systems often rely on basic constituents or sign elements to compose signs. For example, alphabetic writing systems use letters as sign elements to construct words, while Morse code uses dots and dashes. Letters are essential for differentiating word meanings, like the contrast between the words cat, rat, and hat based on their initial letters. The basic sign elements usually do not have a meaning of their own unless combined in systematic ways.

A text is a complex sign made up of several smaller signs, which are combined following the conventions of a particular system. For example, the sentence "The sun is shining" is a text made up of words combined following grammatical rules. The units composing a text are themselves meaningful, unlike the sign elements that compose a basic signs. The meaning of a text, called its message, depends on its components. However, it is usually not a mere aggregate of their isolated meanings, but is shaped by their interaction and organization. In addition to linguistic texts, such as a novel or a mathematical formula, there are also nonlinguistic texts, such as a diagram, a poster, or a musical composition consisting of several movements. The capacity to create and understand texts, known as textuality, is present in some nonhuman animals. For example, honey bees perform a complex dance combining diverse features to communicate information about their environment to other bees.

The meaning of a text can depend on and refer to other texts—a feature called intertextuality. Semioticians distinguish several aspects of texts. Paratext encompasses elements that frame or surround a text, such as titles, headings, acknowledgments, footnotes, and illustrations. Architext refers to the general categories to which a text belongs, such as its genre, style, medium, and authorship. A metatext is a text that comments on another text. A hypotext is a text that serves as the basis for another text, such as a novel that has a sequel or is parodied in another work. In such cases, the derivative text that refers to the earlier work is the hypertext. (Note: The meaning of this term in semiotics differs from its usage in computing, where a hypertext is a digital document that links to other documents.)

=== Structural relations between signs ===
Diagram showing syntagmatic and paradigmatic relations for the sentence "The man sleeps."

The signs in a sign system are connected through several types of structural relations, including syntagmatic and paradigmatic relations. Syntagmatic relations govern how individual signs or sign elements can be combined to form larger expressions. For example, sentences are linear arrangements of words, and syntagmatic relations govern which words can be combined to produce grammatically correct sentences. Similarly, a dinner menu is a sequence of courses with syntagmatic relations governing their arrangement, like beginning with a starter, followed by a main course and a dessert. Some sign systems use non-sequential arrangements, such as traffic signs combining the shape of a sign with the symbol it shows.

Paradigmatic relations are links between signs that belong to the same structural category. They specify which elements can occupy a particular position and can substitute for each other without breaking the system's rules. For example, in the sentence "The man sleeps.", the word man stands in paradigmatic relations to words like woman, child, and person because substituting them also results in a correct sentence. For the dinner menu, the same holds for the different options for the dessert, such as cake, ice cream, and fruit salad. In the case of traffic signs, there are paradigmatic relations between the shape options, such as triangle and circle. The meaning of the chosen paradigmatic option is influenced by the absent options, which form a background of meaningful alternatives. In natural language, these alternatives are typically related to specific word classes. For instance, when a particular word position in a sentence calls for a verb, then the paradigmatic options consist of verbs.

The semiotic square is a tool to analyze the meanings of contrasting terms, such as rich/poor.

Another form of semiotic analysis examines sign pairs consisting of opposites where two signs denote contrasting features and exclude each other, like the pairs good and bad, hot and cold, or new and old. Some contrasts involve a continuous scale with intermediate levels, like fast/slow, whereas others are polar oppositions without degrees in between, such as alive/dead. Early structuralist philosophy is associated with the idea that meaning arises primarily from binary oppositions. The semiotic square, proposed by semiotician Algirdas Greimas, offers a more fine-grained differentiation. It relates a sign, such as rich, to three contrasting terms: its contradictory (not rich), its contrary (poor), and the contradictory of its contrary (not poor).

Another structural feature is asymmetric sign pairs where one item is unmarked and the other marked. The unmarked sign is the generic and neutral expression often taken for granted, whereas the marked sign is specialized and denotes additional features. The unmarked term is more commonly used and is typically privileged as the default or norm. Examples are the pairs dog/bitch, day/night, he/she, and right/left. This asymmetry is of particular interest to the semiotic study of culture as a guide to implicit background assumptions and power relations. For example, patriarchal societies tend to use unmarked forms for masculine terms, while unmarked forms for feminine terms are more common in matriarchal societies.

=== Tropes ===
Semioticians study associative mechanisms through which a sign acquires alternative meanings by interacting with other signs. This change in meaning can occur in cases where the literal meaning of a sign is inadequate or absurd, leading to a shift toward a figurative meaning. For example, the term snake literally refers to a limbless reptile but has a different meaning in the sentence "The professor is a snake."

The mechanisms through which this shift in meaning happens are called tropes. Discussions of tropes sometimes focus on four master tropes (Note: The precise definition of most tropes is disputed, affecting the number of basic tropes proposed to explain more specific tropes.) as the basis of most others: metaphor, metonymy, synecdoche, and irony. A metaphor is an analogy in which attributes from one entity are carried over to another, such as associating the snake-like attributes of being sneaky and cold-blooded with a professor. A metonymy is a way of referring to one object by naming another closely related thing, such as speaking of a king as the crown. Similarly, a synecdoche is a way of referring to one object by naming one of its parts, such as speaking of one's car as my wheels. The trope of irony works through dissimilarity, literally expressing the opposite of what is meant, such as remarking "Great job!" after a horrible failure.

Semiotic tropes are primarily discussed in relation to linguistic sign systems, where they are also known as figures of speech. However, their underlying mechanisms also affect nonlinguistic sign systems. For example, an advertisement for an airline may juxtapose the landing of a plane with the tranquil touchdown of a swan as a pictorial metaphor for grace and reliability. Comics often rely on pictorial metonymies to express emotions, like a raised fist to stand for anger. In photography, close-ups can function as synecdoches by presenting the whole through a part. In film, one type of audiovisual irony presents a horrific visual scene accompanied by incongruously cheerful music.

=== Codes ===
A code is a sign system used to communicate. It includes a set of signs, the meaning relations among them, and the rules for combining them to create and interpret messages. (Note: The exact definition of code is disputed, for example, whether it encompasses a whole system of signs or a rule of correlation that links items belonging to different systems.) Digital codes rely on clear and precise distinctions of how signs are formed and combined, as in written language. They contrast with analog codes, which use continuous variations to convey meaning, such as seamless gradations of color in painting. Simple codes include only a few basic elements and relations, as in the color code of traffic signals. Complex codes, like the English language, can encompass countless elements as well as syntactic and sociocultural norms involved in meaning-making. Conventional codes are human-made constructs, including aesthetic codes used in the creation of artworks, like music and painting. They contrast with natural codes, (Note: According to some definitions, all codes are conventional.) like DNA, which functions as a biochemical information system encoding hereditary information through nucleotide sequences.

Semioticians analyze codes along several dimensions, such as the domain and context they operate in, the sensory channel they rely on, and the function they perform. Some codes focus on the precise expression of knowledge, such as mathematical formulas, while others govern cultural and behavioral norms, including conventions of politeness and ceremonial practices. A code can have domain-specific subcodes that refine its scope of meaning or regulate usage in particular settings. Codes and subcodes are not static frameworks but can evolve as new conventions or technologies emerge.

Code plays a central role in code models of communication, which conceive communication as an exchange of information in which the participants encode and decode messages.

Code also plays a central role in models of communication—conceptual representations of the main components of communication. Many include the idea that a sender conveys a message through a channel to a receiver, who interprets it and may respond with feedback. Encoding is the process of expressing meaning in the form of a message using the system of a specific code. Decoding is the reverse process of interpreting the message to understand its meaning. In some cases, different codes can be used to express the same message. Similarly, messages can typically be translated from one code to another, such as transcribing a written text into Morse code.

Discourse is the social use of language or other codes, taking place at a specific moment in a particular context. Discourse analysis examines how meaning arises in a discourse, considering the communicators and their respective roles, as well as the influences of context and institutional backgrounds.

Semioticians are also interested in how codes reflect and shape human perception of the world. By influencing perception, codes can affect behavior by making individuals aware of possible courses of action. The controversial Whorfian hypothesis suggests that language shapes thought by providing fundamental categories of understanding, with the potential consequence that speakers of different languages think differently.

== Core branches ==
Semiotics is typically divided into three branches: syntactics, semantics, and pragmatics.

An influential categorization, proposed by Charles W. Morris, divides semiotics into three branches: syntactics, semantics, and pragmatics. Syntactics studies formal relations between signs. It investigates how signs combine to form compound signs and which rules govern this process. For example, the rules of grammar in natural languages specify how words may be arranged to form sentences and how different arrangements influence meaning. As a result of the syntactic rules of the English language, the expression "elephants are big" is grammatically correct, whereas "elephants big are" is not. Syntactics is not limited to language and includes the study of nonlinguistic compound signs, such as the arrangement of visual elements in geographic maps.

Semantics studies the relation between signs and what they stand for, examining how signs refer to concrete things and abstract ideas. It typically focuses on the general meaning of a sign rather than its meaning in a particular context. Semantics addresses the meaning of both basic and compound signs. In the linguistic domain, it includes lexical semantics, which explores word meaning, and phrasal semantics, which studies sentence meaning. Other areas include animal semantics, which investigates, for example, how animal warning calls stand for predators.

Pragmatics studies the relation between signs and sign users. It examines how individuals produce and interpret signs in concrete contexts, applying syntactic insights into formal structures and semantic insights into general meaning to real-life situations. The pragmatic dimension of sign use in communication encompasses aspects such as social conventions and expectations, speaker intention, audience, and other contextual factors. For example, it depends on the concrete situation whether the expression "she found a mole" refers to the discovery of an animal, a skin mark, or a spy.

Various academic discussions address the relation between the three branches, such as their relative importance or hierarchy. Historically, syntactics and semantics have received more attention than pragmatics, particularly in the study of linguistic sign systems. One reason for this preferential treatment is the idea that sign usage is largely determined by what signs mean and how they can be combined. As a result, pragmatics has often been regarded as a secondary discipline, reserved for diverse problems that could not be adequately addressed from the perspectives of the other two disciplines. However, this marginal treatment of pragmatics is questioned in the contemporary discourse. Some proposals reverse the priority and see pragmatics as the primary discipline. One reason is the idea that syntactics and semantics are abstractions that cannot be scientifically studied on their own without examining actual sign use.

Another classification of the branches of semiotics distinguishes between general and applied semiotics. General semiotics studies the nature of signs and their operation within sign systems in the widest sense, independent of the domains to which they belong. It contrasts with applied semiotics, which examines signs in particular domains or from discipline-specific perspectives.

== Applications ==
=== Biology ===
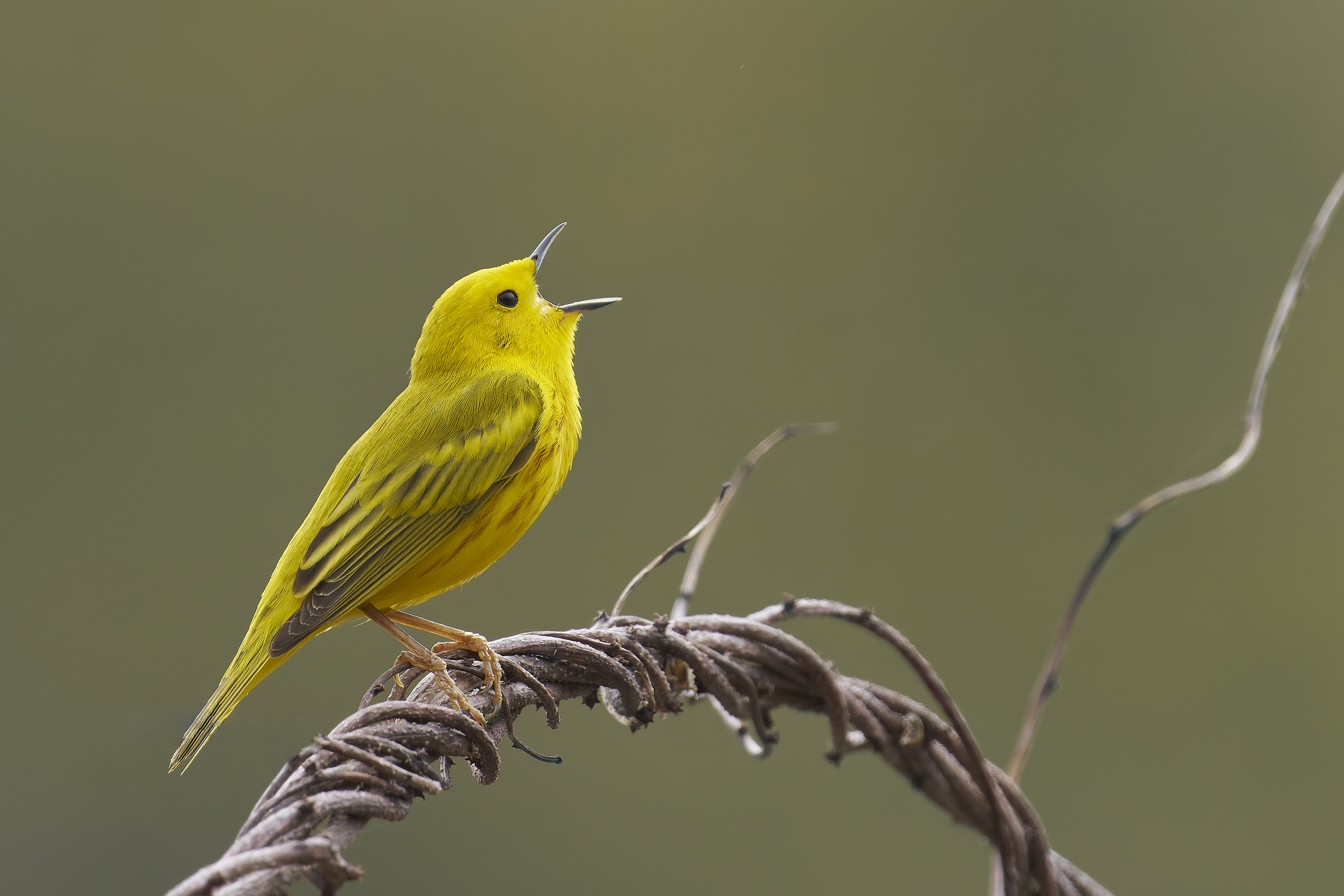
Biosemiotics includes the study of animal communication, such as bird calls.

While the general focus of semiotics is on human communication, biosemiotics integrates this perspective with biology to study how living beings produce and interpret signs through channels such as vision, sound, movement, and chemical cues like smell. It does not restrict sign processes to conscious mental activities and explicitly includes nonintentional processes within its scope. Biosemiotics has branches dedicated to different types of organisms, such as zoosemiotics (animals), phytosemiotics (plants), bacteriosemiotics (bacteria), mycosemiotics (fungi), and protistosemiotics (protists). Anthroposemiotics, which addresses humans, is sometimes included in zoosemiotics or treated as a distinct branch.

The scope of biosemiotics covers semiotic activities on different levels of organization, ranging from cellular information processes to communication between distinct individuals. At the microlevel, there are sign activities within individual organisms. For example, genes encode information about hereditary traits, and diverse biological processes decode and activate this information. Similarly, hormones function as signaling molecules that control physiological functions by conveying information over long distances in the body. Biosemioticians also study how nerve cells communicate with each other and how neurotransmitters regulate this process. This topic is more closely examined by neurosemiotics, which investigates neural processes involved in sign interpretation and meaning-making.

At the macrolevel, there are sign processes between distinct organisms. They happen primarily between individuals of the same species as forms of cooperation or coordination. For example, birds use calls to attract mates, warn of predators, and maintain territorial boundaries. Similar semiotic processes also happen in the plant kingdom, such as airborne chemicals released by maple trees as a warning signal of herbivore attacks. In some cases, communication happens between members of distinct species. For instance, flowers use symmetrical shapes and vivid colors as signs to guide insects to nectar. Because of the pervasive nature of sign processes, biosemioticians typically argue that semiosis is not a rare phenomenon limited to specific biological niches but an intrinsic feature of life in general.

=== Culture ===
Several branches of applied semiotics study cultural phenomena, encompassing the systems of beliefs, values, norms, and practices shared within a society. The semiotics of culture analyzes sign systems used in cultural practices by examining the meanings and ideological assumptions they embody. It integrates findings from fields such as psychology, anthropology, archaeology, linguistics, and neuroscience. It addresses both the fundamental characteristics of culture in general and the distinctive features of specific cultural formations, such as myths, aesthetics, cuisine, clothing, rituals, and artifacts. More broadly, the semiotics of culture explores how culture differs from nature and which processes give rise to cultural formations. Social semiotics, a related field, studies sign practices as social phenomena in cultural contexts. It also investigates the social construction of reality. This includes semiotic practices that establish social meanings, categories, and norms shaping how people perceive the world and what they take for granted. Related fields include semiotic anthropology, which analyzes how sign systems reproduce, transmit, and change culture, and ethnosemiotics, which examines and compares semiotic phenomena within specific ethnic groups.

Semioticians have been particularly interested in cultural myths, which they understand as structures of meaning that codify ideologies. In this sense, myths are not only a specific genre of literature but encompass widely shared views about human nature or the world. For example, pervasive ideological myths in Western culture include the idea of progress, which frames history as a linear series of improvements, and individualism, which conceives individuals as autonomous and self-reliant agents. Myths help people make sense of experience and guide behavior through common frameworks that conceptualize phenomena. Semiotic analysis sees myths as secondary sign systems that use other signs as vehicles to convey their ideas, often in the form of metaphors. For instance, the image of a child represents a child on the literal level. However, it can at the same time embody a myth of childhood associated with innocence and purity, motivating social arrangements associated with protection and parenting. Semioticians analyze this secondary level of signification across diverse media, such as literature, film, and advertising.

In specific areas of culture, semiotics examines the codes and conventions they employ and the meanings they produce. The semiotics of clothing studies clothing as a nonverbal sign system. Clothes are often implicitly interpreted as signs of the personality and social status of the wearer, covering features such as gender, age, and political beliefs. Different social occasions are associated with distinct dress codes, such as uniforms for sport, the military, and religious rituals. Similarly, the semiotics of food analyzes food items as bearers of cultural meanings. It explores how culinary practices reflect social organization and belief systems, like cooking methods, table etiquette, taboos against eating certain items, the cultural roles of fasting and feasting, and food symbolism. Research topics in popular internet culture include the codes and conventions of emojis and internet memes.

=== Literature ===
Text semiotics studies the meanings of linguistic texts. It typically focuses on larger fragments of discourse, leaving the analysis of smaller units, like phonemes, to linguistics. Text semiotics plays a central role in literary criticism by exploring the codes, conventions, and tropes employed in literary texts. It situates these insights within broader cultural and semiotic frameworks.

Central schools of thought in text semiotics include structuralism and post-structuralism. Structuralism assumes that structural relations within sign systems are the primary source of meaning and understanding. It examines how texts employ these patterns, such as binary oppositions between good and evil or nature and culture, often to identify ideological biases. Post-structuralism argues that sign systems are self-referential and cannot provide a stable representation of reality. The post-structuralist method of deconstruction aims to reveal contradictions and ambiguities within texts, for example, by showing how a text unintentionally undermines a binary opposition on which it relies.

Serving as a precursor and neighboring discipline of text semiotics, hermeneutics is the study of interpretation. It originated in the examination of mythological and religious texts. It was used by medieval Christian philosophers to decode the theological and moral doctrines of the Bible, for instance, by distinguishing literal from spiritual meanings and analyzing symbolic structures associated with allegories. Modern hermeneutics extends these practices to secular texts. The hermeneutic circle is a central concept in this field. It is the idea that understanding involves a circular movement in which preconceptions guide interpretation and interpretation shapes preconceptions. It is sometimes explained as an interplay where understanding the text as a whole depends on understanding its parts and vice versa. It is debated whether there is a single correct interpretation of every text or whether incompatible interpretations can be valid at the same time.

Narratology is a branch of semiotics that studies narrative texts, such as tales and stories. It assumes that there is a universal narrative code of the different elements found in narratives, meaning that individual texts only express variations of the same underlying code. For example, according to Algirdas Julien Greimas's actantial model, these elements include a subject, such as the hero of the story, an entity that they desire, and an opponent or obstacle to their goal. Other research directions in text semiotics are stylistics and rhetoric, which compare different styles and explore how texts persuade.

=== Arts and media ===
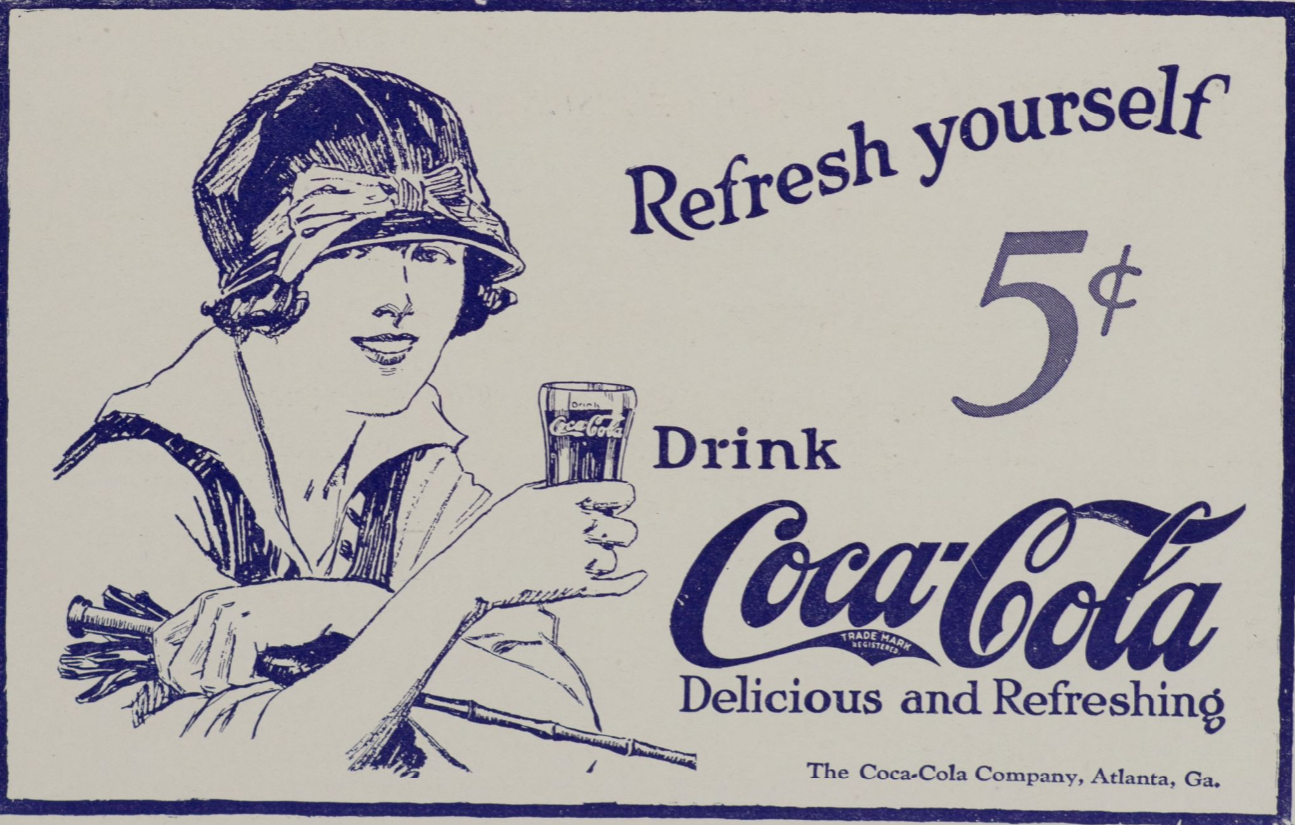
In the study of advertising, semioticians examine the use of linguistic and nonlinguistic codes to target consumers.

Semiotics has diverse applications in the analysis of art and other media, ranging from film and music to advertising and video games. The field of media semiotics studies how meaning is produced, interpreted, and shared in media, such as newspapers, radio, television, and the internet. Understood in the widest sense, it encompasses all channels of everyday communication, including shop signs and posters.

In the visual arts, semioticians examine how meaning is created through aspects such as color, shape, texture, composition, and perspective. For example, colors can express different moods, emotions, and atmospheres, such as warm and soft colors in contrast to cold and harsh ones. Colors can also have culture-specific symbolic meanings, such as pink signifying femininity. Semioticians are further interested in the representational dimension of images, studying how they may act as icons that represent their motive through similarity. In photography, images may additionally function as indexical signs because of the causal connection between the depicted object and the photograph.

Musical semiotics studies music as a meaning-making process involving signifiers and signifieds. There is substantial disagreement about the extent to which music is a semiotic activity. Some theoretical attempts treat sounds as individual signs and compositions as compound signs or messages, while others argue that sounds and compositions signify nothing beyond themselves. Another research approach investigates the cultural significance of music, for example, how musical styles, like heavy metal, reggae, and classical music, are associated with different subcultures and lifestyles.

Film semiotics analyzes films as sign activities, exploring how visual and auditory codes interact. Some theorists compare films to language, arguing that individual shots act as words and that montages, which combine several shots, correspond to sentences. A key difference to many other forms of language is that film involves asymmetrical communication since there is usually no direct way for spectators to respond to messages. The semiotics of architecture, another field, examines how buildings communicate meaning, including their practical functions, symbolic associations, and aesthetic dimensions.

The semiotics of advertising studies how advertisements use and combine signs to influence consumers. Advertisements typically combine linguistic and nonlinguistic codes. For instance, print ads typically use language for the brand name and verbal commentary, while visual elements convey nonverbal messages to the target audience. In many cases, the core message, related to the economic reality of selling a product, is not stated explicitly. Instead, an indirect message is used to make the product appealing.

Computer games integrate elements from many other media and combine them with an interactive dimension. They include diverse sign elements, for example, to explain how to interact with the virtual world, set goals, provide feedback, and establish a narrative.

=== Cognition ===
Cognitive semiotics is an interdisciplinary field that examines how mental processes contribute to meaning-making. It integrates insights from diverse disciplines, including semiotics, cognitive science, linguistics, anthropology, psychology, and philosophy. Cognitive semioticians study sign activity from complementary perspectives: the subjective first-person perspective, the intersubjective second-person perspective, and the objective third-person perspective. While acknowledging the validity of each perspective in its respective area, the field privileges first-person and second-person methods as offering more direct access to the mental dimension of meaning. For example, it relies on phenomenological descriptions to analyze how sign processes shape experience. By examining how meaning operates in the mind, it contrasts with certain aspects of biosemiotics that address sign processes without mental activity, as in genetics.

A central approach in cognitive semiotics understands mind and cognition in terms of practical engagement with the world rather than theoretical attempts to model or depict it. It argues that meaning includes representation as one way of engaging with the world, but is not limited to it. Its primary focus is on nonrepresentational forms of meaning, such as habits, values, and other ways individuals attune to their environment. From this perspective, sign structures are understood as processes that shape habits and dispositions to act in different circumstances, emphasizing that meaning is a dynamic process rather than a static product. (Note: Finite semiotics is another cognition-based approach to semiotic theory. It explains semiosis as an effect of the finite nature of the human mind that occurs as an individual passes from one cognitive state to another.)

=== Others ===
In the field of nonverbal communication, semioticians investigate the exchange of information without linguistic sign systems. For example, body language includes signifying practices like raising a thumb and other gestures, as well as facial expressions like laughing and frowning. Other types of nonverbal communication encompass touching behavior, like shaking hands or kissing, and the use of personal space, such as the distance between speakers to express their degree of familiarity. Paralanguage encompasses nonverbal elements of linguistic messages. For instance, pitch and loudness in a conversation can express emotion or emphasis without stating them explicitly.

Semiotics has various applications in psychoanalysis. Sigmund Freud developed a theory of dream interpretation to understand and resolve psychological conflicts. He argued that elements of dreams act as symbols representing unconscious desires and fears, such as the idea that dreams of losing a tooth can signify castration anxiety or fear of impotence. Semiotics also plays a central role in the psychoanalytic theory of Jacques Lacan, who argued that the unconscious is structured like a language.

In the field of computing, semiotics has been used to describe programming languages and analyze human–computer interaction. Attempts have also been made to develop formal theories of semiotics that enable computational processes to perform semiotic analyses. This approach, known as computational semiotics, analyzes meaning-making through computer technology using algorithmic and mathematical methods and includes the semiotic study of computation. Cybersemiotics, another approach, combines biosemiotics with cybernetics to provide a unified framework of semiotic processes across biological, social, and technological domains. In mathematics, semiotics examines the meaning of mathematical symbols and formulas, addressing questions about what they refer to, how they relate to mental activity, and how they influence mathematics education.

Edusemiotics is a research movement that conceptualizes semiotic activity as the foundation of educational theory. For instance, it understands teaching and learning as sign processes. Semioethics is a critical approach that examines the ethical dimension of sign activities. It seeks to diagnose problems that arise in the context of global communication. Medical semiotics studies how disease symptoms, such as pain, dizziness, and fever, indicate medical conditions. Legal semiotics investigates sign activities in legal practice, including the interpretation of evidence, testimony, and legal texts.

== Methods ==
Semioticians use diverse methods to analyze and compare signs and sign systems. Different domains of signs and perspectives of inquiry typically call for distinct techniques depending on the forms of representation and modes of meaning-making under study. Thus, there is no universally adopted methodology but only an interdisciplinary, loosely connected set of approaches. Within a given domain, semioticians typically seek to determine what meaning is produced, why it emerges the way it does, and how it is encoded.

Structural analysis examines the structural framework of texts and sign systems, exploring the syntagmatic and paradigmatic relations underlying signification. The commutation test is an influential tool for structural analysis. It explores how the meanings of linguistic and nonlinguistic texts are shaped by their components and what roles specific signs play in this process. It proceeds by changing certain elements of a text, either actually or as a thought experiment, and assesses whether or how this change affects the overall meaning. For example, in the analysis of an advertisement, a semiotician may probe whether the overall message changes if a woman is shown using the product instead of a man. If it does, then gender is a signifying element. The way the overall message changes provides insights into the semiotic role of the changed aspect. The commutation test can be applied to a wide range of elements or features, such as shape, size, color, camera angle, typeface, age, class, and ethnicity. Instead of replacing one element with another, other versions of the commutation test add or remove elements to explore, for instance, what draws attention through its absence or what is taken for granted. (Note: A similar interpretative strategy studies textual elements that deviate from norms, conventions, or expectations. Another related approach examines how the meaning of one element is anchored by the presence of another element, like when the meaning of an image is anchored by its caption.)

In the study of cultural sign systems, semioticians often focus on hidden meanings and connotations, such as ideological messages and power dynamics that influence meaning-making without being immediately apparent to observers. This dimension can be studied in diverse ways, such as comparing marked and unmarked terms to reveal how cultural norms privilege certain meanings and marginalize others. Critical discourse analysis has a similar goal, seeking to understand how texts and social reality shape each other. It is particularly interested in how ideologies and power relations are reproduced in discourse, for example, by analyzing how political actors depict immigrants as threats to promote restrictive immigration policies.

Another approach to semiotics focuses on the historical dimension of sign systems and semiotic practices. It examines how they came into existence and evolved, studying how the relevant codes and media developed and how new conventions and genres emerged. The historical inquiry also considers the effects of technological developments, for instance, by tracing how the invention of the printing press and the internet have shaped the way people engage with written texts.

Although qualitative investigation is the dominant approach in semiotics, some researchers also use quantitative methods. For example, many forms of content analysis examine objective patterns found in an individual document or an entire discourse and employ statistical analysis to discover systematic patterns in sign usage. Applied to the news coverage of a violent incident, a content analyst may gather statistical information about how often the perpetrators are described as rebels rather than terrorists. Quantitative data on its own is usually not sufficient to explain complex semiotic processes, which is why content analysis is typically combined with other approaches.

In applied semiotics, researchers often tailor their approach to the specific area of signs under investigation. For instance, biosemioticians may adapt concepts intended for linguistic analysis to biological codes like DNA. In some cases, this requires conceptual modifications, for example, when terms like interpretation are applied to sign processes without a conscious subject.

== History ==
=== Ancient and medieval ===
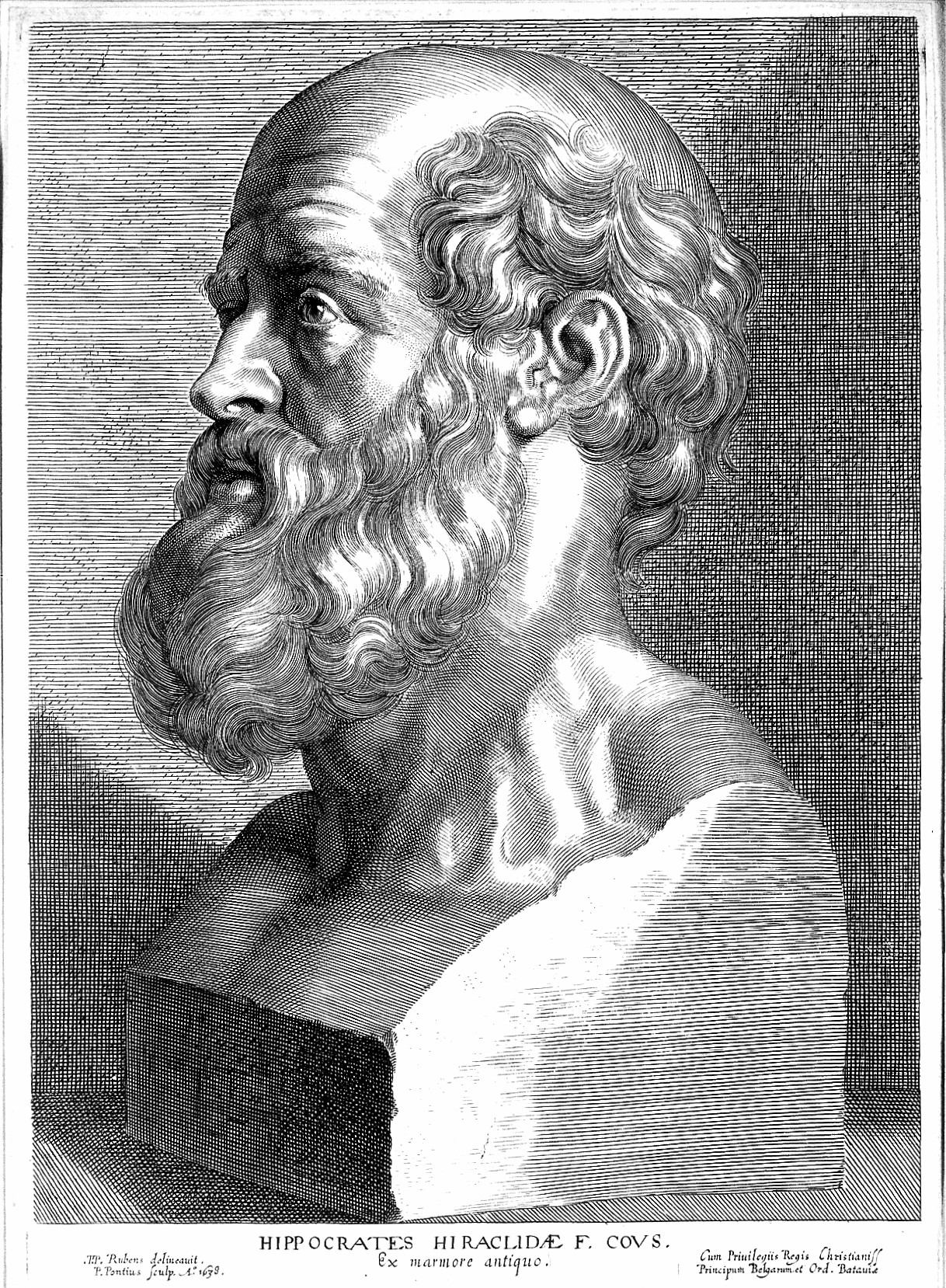
Hippocrates pioneered the study of medical signs.

The study of signs has its origin in antiquity. Early approaches examined concrete patterns that indicate underlying conditions or future outcomes, such as medical diagnosis and divination. Some clay tablets from Mesopotamia, dating to the 3rd millennium BCE, document this practice, such as the interpretation of the moon's visibility as a sign of an impending drought. In ancient Greek thought, Hippocrates (c. 460 – c. 370 BCE) and later Galen of Pergamum (129 – c. 216 CE) investigated medical signs as indications of underlying diseases, establishing semeiosis or symptomatology as a branch of medicine.

In philosophy, Plato (c. 427 – c. 347 BCE) explored whether the relation between linguistic signs and their referents is natural or conventional. His student Aristotle (384 – 322 BCE) distinguished verbal from nonverbal signs. He argued that verbal signs represent mental states, which refer to external things, whereas nonverbal signs guide inference to expand knowledge. (Note: Aristotle also proposed a triadic model of signs, with a sign vehicle, an object as referent, and a mental concept that mediates between the two.) Starting in the 3rd century BCE, the Stoics defended a triadic model of signs, understanding sign vehicle and referent as material objects linked through nonmaterial meaning. In the same period, the Epicureans proposed a dyadic model, emphasizing a direct connection between sign vehicle and referent without meaning as a separate component to link them. Philodemus (c. 110 – c. 40 BCE) provided a detailed overview of discussions about the Epicurean theory of signs, such as debates about how signs aid inferences from the known to the unknown.

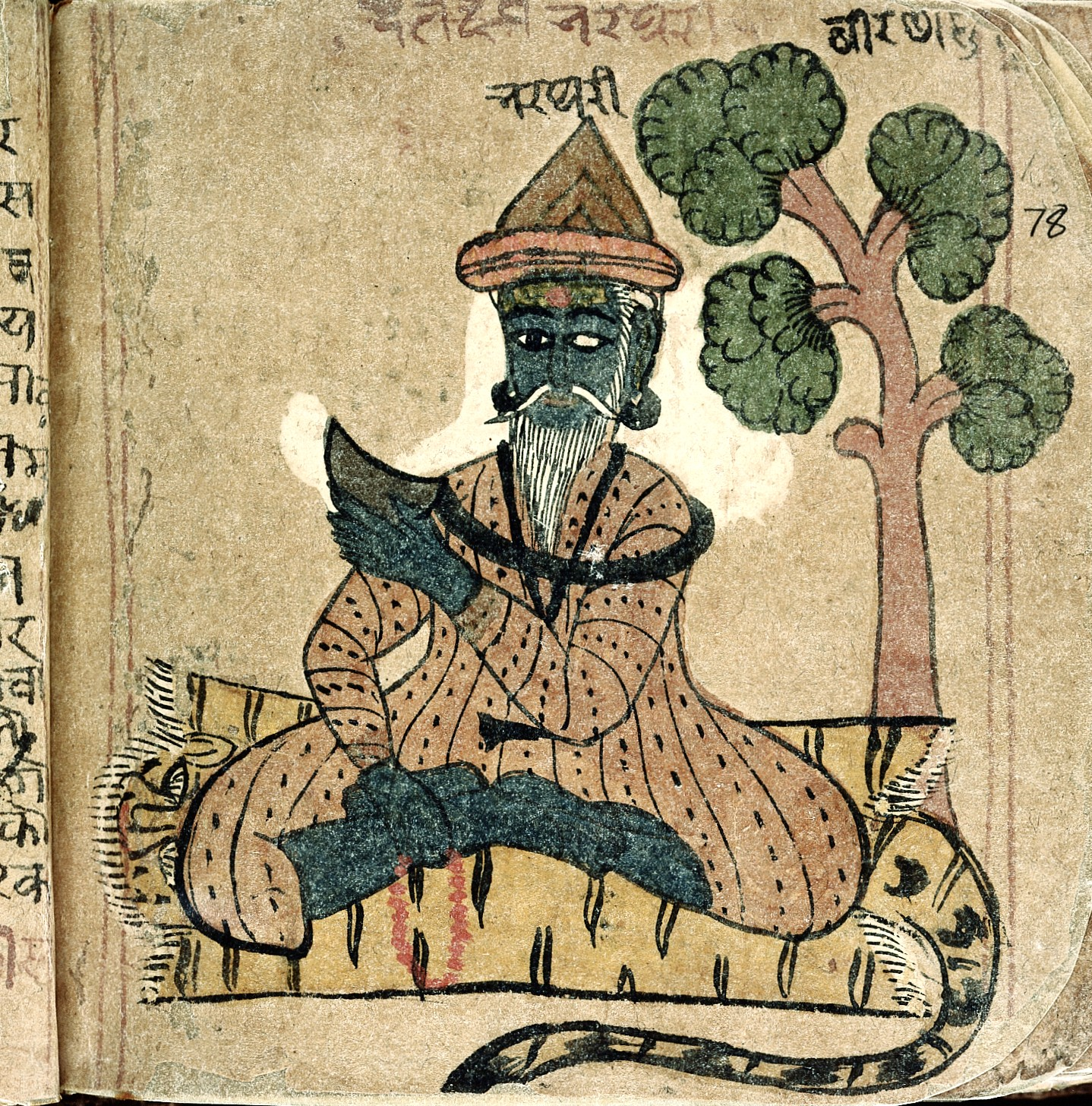
Bhartṛhari explored how cognition depends on linguistic signs.

In ancient India, various schools of Hinduism examined semiotic phenomena. In the first millennium BCE, Nyāya studied the relations between names, things, and knowledge, while Mīmāṃsā addressed the connection between word meaning and sentence meaning. The philosopher Bhartṛhari (4th–5th century CE) developed and compared theories of meaning, arguing that sentences are the primary bearers of meaning. He asserted that cognition depends on linguistic categorization, for example, that names make it possible to individuate and perceive distinct objects.

Semiotic thought is present in Buddhist philosophy. The Mahāyāna-sūtrālamkāra-kārikā, a text from the 4th century CE, and related scriptures in the Yogachara tradition explored the spiritual role of semiosis. They suggested that the sign-activity in ordinary experience misconceives reality and that one can achieve a signless awareness that avoids this problem.

In ancient China, Mohism arose in the 5th century BCE. It understood sign use as the practical skill of drawing distinctions and argued that the standards of correct sign use depend on shared social conventions. The School of Names, another tradition of Chinese philosophy, emerged in the 5th century BCE and explored the relation between names and things. Its followers practiced a method of public disputation, for example, to decide whether two names refer to the same thing or to different things.

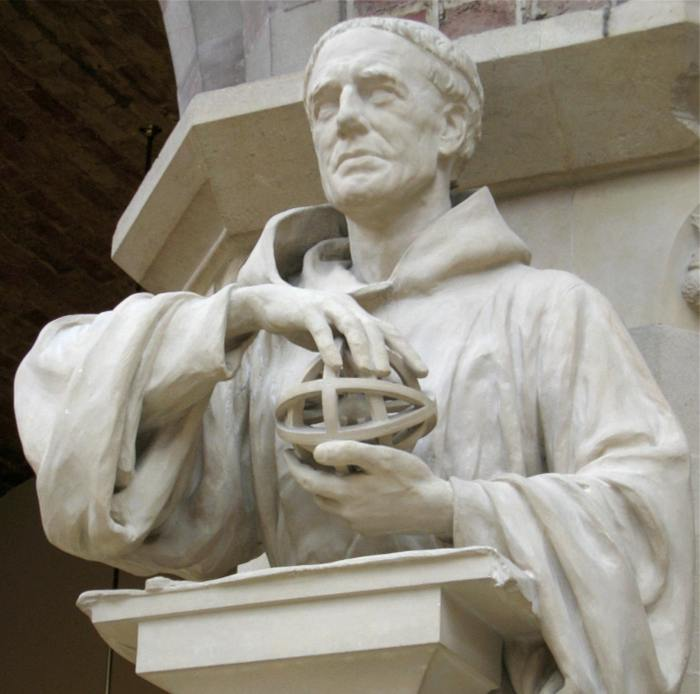
Roger Bacon developed a complex classification of signs.

A late-antique precursor of medieval semiotics, Augustine (354–430 CE) drew on Stoic and Epicurean ideas to develop one of the first systematic theories of signs, framing it from a Christian perspective according to which the objects of semiosis are indexical signs revealing the will of God. He examined the relations between signs, meanings, and interpreters, distinguishing between natural signs (such as smoke indicating fire) and given signs (such as linguistic symbols). Boethius (c. 480 – 528 CE) analyzed sign activity as a chain of signification: writing refers to speech, speech expresses mental concepts, and mental concepts represent external things. Peter Abelard (1079–1142 CE) studied nonlinguistic sign processes, such as images and conventional gestures.

The most detailed medieval account of signs was proposed by Roger Bacon (c. 1214 – c. 1293), who understood signs as triadic relations between sign vehicle, represented thing, and interpreter. He developed a complex classification that distinguishes between natural signs and signs directed by the soul, with several subtypes in each category. Starting in the 13th century, the Modist grammarians proposed that all languages share a universal grammar that reflects the shared structure of the modes of being, understanding, and signifying. William of Sherwood (c. 1200 – c. 1272), Peter of Spain (c. 1210 – c. 1277), and William of Ockham (c. 1287 – 1347) formulated contextual theories of meaning and reference. In the Islamic world, philosophers explored semiotic topics from a religious perspective. They addressed the problem of how to interpret signs of Allah in the Quran and whether to describe Allah by affirming or negating attributes. Influential theorists were al-Kindi (c. 801 – c. 873), al-Farabi (c. 870 – c. 950), and Avicenna (c. 980–1037).

=== Modern and contemporary ===
In the early modern period, John Poinsot (1589–1644) integrated ideas of Thomas Aquinas (1225–1274) to investigate how signs mediate between objective reality and subjective experience. The Port-Royal school, another tradition, formulated a mind-based theory of signs. It argued that signs consist of two ideas: one for the representing entity and one for the represented entity. Gottfried Wilhelm Leibniz (1646–1716) understood signs as visible marks that stand for ideas. He saw them as indispensable tools of thought, enabling operations on complex semantic concepts without apprehending them in full. John Locke (1632–1704) proposed a general science or doctrine of signs to examine the link between knowledge and representation. He identified two types of signs: ideas are signs of things, and words are signs of ideas, effectively functioning as signs of signs. Christian Wolff (1679–1754) distinguished different types of natural signs based on how they indicate the existence of an entity either in the past, the present, or the future. Johann Heinrich Lambert (1728–1777) developed a theory of signs and explored how knowledge depends on sign activity.

In the late 19th and early 20th centuries, semiotics emerged as a distinct field of inquiry. The twin origins of this process lie in the works of the philosopher Charles Sanders Peirce (1839–1914) and the linguist Ferdinand de Saussure (1857–1913), who separately articulated the foundational principles of the discipline. Peirce developed a triadic model, understanding signs as relations that can apply to any sign vehicle that is interpreted to stand for something else. He distinguished different types of relations between sign vehicle and referent and used this distinction to classify signs as indices, icons, and symbols. As a pragmatist, Peirce focused on the effects of sign processes while emphasizing the dynamic nature of meaning. (Note: Analyzing language, Peirce also introduced the distinction between types and tokens. A type is a general pattern or universal class, whereas a token is an individual instance of a type. For example, the word banana encompasses six letter tokens (b, a, n, a, n, and a), which belong to three distinct types (b, a, and n).) Charles W. Morris (1901–1979) popularized Peircean semiotics and integrated it with behaviorism. He conceptualized syntactics, semantics, and pragmatics as the main branches of the field.

Saussure proposed a dyadic model that understands signs as relations in the mind between a sensible form and a concept. He emphasized the arbitrary nature of this relation and explored how signs form sign systems, such as language. Saussure distinguished synchronic or static from diachronic or historical aspects of language. (Note: Saussure's main interest was in synchronic aspects, or how language as a static system functions at a particular point in time. Diachronic aspects, by contrast, concern the historical dimension of how a language evolves.) He formulated the foundations of structuralism to investigate how differences between signs, such as binary oppositions, are the primary mechanism of meaning.

Based on Saussure's structuralism, Louis Hjelmslev (1899–1965) developed glossematics, which divides language into basic units defined only by the formal functions they play in a sign system. Focused on articulating a general semiotics, Algirdas Julien Greimas (1917–1992) expanded glossematics and applied it to narratology, aiming to discern a universal code underlying narrative texts. Claude Lévi-Strauss (1908–2009) employed the principles of structural semiotics to engage in ethnology, analyzing myths and cultural practices as sign systems that reveal how different cultures make sense of the world. Roland Barthes (1915–1980) used the theories of Saussure and Hjelmslev to study literature and media, covering signifying processes in myths, theology, pictures, advertising, and fashion. In these fields, he often examined how connotations encode subtle ideological messages.

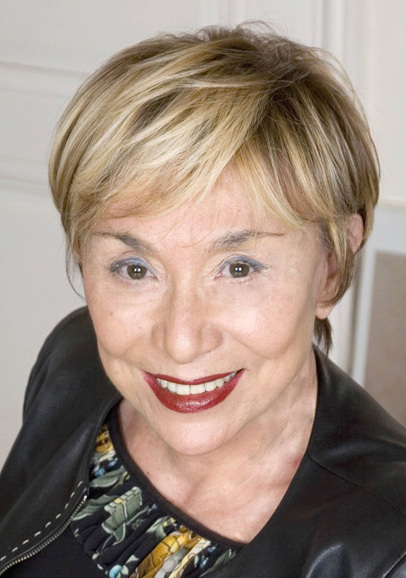
Julia Kristeva's thought combines semiotic, psychoanalytic, and feminist approaches.

Using the phenomenological method, Edmund Husserl (1859–1938) studied the nature of signs and meaning through the description of experience. He contrasted the direct awareness of objects in perception with the indirect awareness of signs as objects that refer to something other than themselves. In psychoanalysis, Sigmund Freud (1856–1939) interpreted dream elements as signs of unconscious desires. Jacques Lacan (1901–1981) expanded Freud's ideas, analyzing the structure of the unconscious as a sign system. Drawing on psychoanalysis and feminism, Julia Kristeva (born 1941) has explored the problem of intertextuality and conceptualized the semiotic and the symbolic as two contrasting dimensions of signification.

Jakob von Uexküll (1864–1944) pioneered the study of animal and plant semiosis. He understood the interaction between organism and environment as a process of sign exchange in which individuals respond to cues that are relevant to their species-specific needs and capacities. Uexküll argued that different species inhabit distinct perceptual worlds based on their selective interpretation of cues. Thomas A. Sebeok (1920–2001) relied on Uexküll's ideas to establish biosemiotics as a branch of semiotics, covering sign processes within and between organisms, such as animals, plants, and fungi.

Roman Jakobson (1896–1982) contributed to various schools of thought, including Russian formalism, the Prague School, and the Copenhagen School. Adopting structuralism, he reinterpreted Saussure's dyadic model and later incorporated Peircean ideas, such as an emphasis on contextual factors. (Note: Jakobson also examined the different components and functions of communication.) Yuri Lotman (1922–1993) engaged in cultural semiotics, analyzing cultural formations in terms of models that showcase distinctive features of their origin culture. Umberto Eco (1932–2016) understood semiotics as the study of communicative processes in culture, focusing the field on conventional codes. He explored the idea of unlimited semiosis, according to which the interpretation of signs is an open-ended process leading to further signs. Jacques Derrida (1930–2004) was an influential proponent of post-structuralism. He developed the method of deconstruction to discover internal ambiguities and contradictions within texts. The second half of the 20th century saw the emergence of many journals dedicated to semiotics, while international institutions, such as the International Association for Semiotic Studies, were established. With the rise of digital media in the late 20th century, semiotic approaches have been used to study how the internet shapes communication and perceptions of reality, including phenomena such as the use of emojis and the spread of internet memes.

== See also ==
- Ecosemiotics – Branch of semiotics
- Index of semiotics articles
- Outline of semiotics – Overview of and topical guide to semiotics
- Philosophy of language – Branch of philosophy
- Semiofest – Conference series and event on semiotics
- Semiotica – Academic journal on semiotics
- Sign Systems Studies – Academic journal on semiotics
- The American Journal of Semiotics – Academic journal on semiotics
