= Index of semiotics articles =

The following is a list of semiotics terms; that is, those words used in semiotics, the discussion, classification, criticism, and analysis of the study of sign processes (semiosis), analogy, metaphor, signification and communication, signs and symbols. This list also includes terms which are not part of semiotic theory per se but which are commonly found alongside their semiotic brethren - these terms come from linguistics, literary theory and narratology.

== A ==
- Addressee (Imported from linguistic theory)

== B ==
- Biosemiotics

== C ==
- Codes
- Connotation
- Commutation tests

== D ==
- Decode
- Denotation

== E ==
- Ecosemiotics
- Encode

== F ==
- Film semiotics

== I ==
- Iconicity
- Indexicality
- Interpretant (Peircean semeiotic system)

== L ==
- Lexical
- Long-term nuclear waste warning messages (Nuclear semiotics)

== M ==
- Meaning
- Modality

== N ==
- Narrator (Imported term from narratology)

== P ==
- Paradigmatic analysis
- Paradigms
- Paratext (A term from narratology)

== R ==
- Receiver (mathematical/transmission theory of communication)

== S ==
- Semiotic
- Semiosis
- Semiosphere
- Semiotics of agriculture
- Semiotics of music videos
- Semiotics of dress
- Signs
- Signified (Signifié)
- Signified
- Signifier (Signifiant)
- Signifier
- Symbol
- Syntagmatic analysis
- Syntagmatic structures

== T ==
- Tropes (Imported from linguistics)

== V ==
- Values

== Z ==
- Zoosemiotics
