= Martin Krampen =

German academic (1928–2015)

- Born: March 9, 1928; Siegen, Germany
- Died: June 18, 2015 (aged 87)

Academic work
- Discipline: Biosemiotics
- Sub-discipline: Phytosemiotics

Martin Krampen (March 9, 1928, in Siegen – June 18, 2015, in Ulm) was a leading German semiotician, semiotics Professor in Göttingen.

== Biography ==
The son of a Protestant pastor, Krampen was born on March 9, 1928, in Siegen and was raised in Wuppertal. He took courses in psychology, philosophy, and theology the university of University of Tübingen and the University of Heidelberg, and studied design with a focus on painting at Accademia delle Belle Arti di Firenze. In 1953 Krampen began studying graphic design and visual communication at the Ulm School of Design. After graduating from the school with a diploma in, he went on to obtain his PhD in Visual Communications from Michigan State University in 1962. While there his studies were focused design and psychology.

Krampen worked in the field of visual semiotics and environmental perception, as well as a professional artist. Over the course of his career Krampen held position at universities across North America and Europe teaching courses in social psychology, semiotics, and the psychology of design. He was the University of Waterloo's first full-time research associate, where he worked alongside professor George Soulis to study the influence of design on industry. Krampen taught Visual Communication at Hochschule der Künste from 1977 until his retirement in 1993.

Krampen is credited with establishing the field phytosemiotics, the study of vegetative semiosis. His work would go on to become an important branch of semiotic biology or biosemiotics. Donald Favareau notes that Krampen's 1981 publication "Phytosemiotics" in Semiotica is referenced in nearly every introductory overview of the field and that his work is responsible for expanding the scope of Thomas Sebeok's zoosemiotics info the broader study of signs in relation to living organisms. In a similar acknowledgement of Krampen's influence, Kalevi Kull credits Krampen's work as "an important step in incorporating biology into semiotics."

He was a co-editor of Zeitschrift für Semiotik.

== Select publications ==
- Krampen, Martin (1 July 1963). "Handedness as a Variable of Importance in Determining Apparent Movement Direction". The Journal of Psychology. 56 (1): 61–67. doi:10.1080/00223980.1963.9923698. ISSN 0022-3980.
- Krampen, Martin (1965). "Signs and Symbols in Graphic Communication". Design Quarterly (62): 1–31. doi:10.2307/4047303. JSTOR 4047303.
- Classics of Semiotics. New York: Springer Science & Business Media. 1987. ISBN 9780306423215.
- "Meaning in the urban environment". Routledge; 2013 May 13.
- "A semiotic perspective on the sciences: Steps toward a new paradigm".Anderson, M., Deely, J., Krampen, M., Ransdell, J., Sebeok, T.A. and von Uexküll, T., 1984. Essential Readings in Biosemiotics, p. 377.
- "Phytosemiotics". Semiotica, 1981, 36(3–4), pp. 187–210.
