= Copenhagen–Tartu school =

Network of biosemioticians associated with Copenhagen and Tartu University

Copenhagen–Tartu school of biosemiotics is a loose network of scholars working within the discipline of biosemiotics at the University of Tartu and the University of Copenhagen.

== History ==
The school has been instrumental in developing biosemiotics as a new perspective on the study of life, in the biological and environmental sciences. Notable semioticians working in the Copenhagen–Tartu school are: Kalevi Kull, Jesper Hoffmeyer, Claus Emmeche, Frederik Stjernfelt, Søren Brier, Peeter Torop, Timo Maran, Mihhail Lotman.

Occasionally also the name 'Tartu–Bloomington–Copenhagen school' has been used, as having succeeded the earlier Tartu–Moscow school.

The biosemiotic co-work between the Tartu and Copenhagen groups was established in early 1990s. In 2001, Tartu and Copenhagen scholars inaugurated the annual international conferences for biosemiotic research known as the Gatherings in Biosemiotics, later organised by the International Society for Biosemiotic Studies.

The School values the classical works of Jakob von Uexküll and Juri Lotman as well as those of Charles Sanders Peirce.

== Key texts ==
- Emmeche, Claus; Kull, Kalevi (eds.) 2011. Towards a Semiotic Biology: Life is the Action of Signs. London: Imperial College Press.
- Hoffmeyer Jesper 2008. Biosemiotics: An Examination into the Signs of Life and the Life of Signs. Scranton, University of Scranton Press.
- Kull, Kalevi; Deacon, Terrence; Emmeche, Claus; Hoffmeyer, Jesper; Stjernfelt, Frederik 2009. Theses on biosemiotics: Prolegomena to a theoretical biology. Biological Theory: Integrating Development, Evolution, and Cognition 4(2): 167–173.
- Kull, Kalevi; Emmeche, Claus; Favareau, Donald 2008. Biosemiotic questions. Biosemiotics 1(1): 41–55.

== See also ==
- Tartu–Moscow Semiotic School
