= Sensory ecology =

Study of how organisms sense their environment

Sensory ecology is a relatively new field focusing on the information organisms obtain about their environment. It includes questions of what information is obtained, how it is obtained (the mechanism), and why the information is useful to the organism (the function).

Sensory ecology is the study of how organisms acquire, process, and respond to information from their environment. All individual organisms interact with their environment (consisting of both animate and inanimate components), and exchange materials, energy, and sensory information. Ecology has generally focused on the exchanges of matter and energy, while sensory interactions have generally been studied as influences on behavior and functions of certain physiological systems (sense organs). The relatively new area of sensory ecology has emerged as more researchers focus on questions concerning information in the environment. This field covers topics ranging from the neurobiological mechanisms of sensory systems to the behavioral patterns employed in the acquisition of sensory information to the role of sensory ecology in larger evolutionary processes such as speciation and reproductive isolation. While human perception is largely visual, other species may rely more heavily on different senses. In fact, how organisms perceive and filter information from their environment varies widely. Organisms experience different perceptual worlds, also known as "umwelten", as a result of their sensory filters. These senses range from smell (olfaction), taste (gustation), hearing (mechanoreception), and sight (vision) to pheromone detection, pain detection (nociception), electroreception and magnetoreception. For example, magnetoreception establishes a magnetic compass for many different species, helping animals like migratory birds move in respective migratory directions, marine turtles head away from the shore, guide honeybee's building activities, and aid salamanders in being able to identify borders between water and land. Because different species rely on different senses, sensory ecologists seek to understand which environmental and sensory cues are more important in determining the behavioral patterns of certain species. In recent years, this information has been widely applied in conservation and management fields.

== Reactions of organisms to environmental changes ==
=== Noise level changes ===
Communication is the key to many species interactions. In particular, many species rely on vocalizations for information such as potential mates, nearby predators, or food availability. Human changes in the habitat modify acoustic environments and may make it more difficult for animals to communicate. Humans may alter acoustic environments by modifying background noise levels, modifying habitat, or changing species composition. These changes in acoustic environments can mask the vocalizations of various species. Because humans can exert such strong changes on acoustic environments, sensory ecologists have been particularly interested in researching and understanding how organisms react to these changes.

Anthropogenic changes to acoustic environments have had perhaps the most significant impacts on species that rely on auditory cues for foraging and communication. Bats, for example, rely on ultrasonic echolocation to locate and catch prey. When these auditory cues are masked by loud background noises, the bats become less efficient at finding prey. Sensory ecologists have also found that foraging bats avoid noisy habitats, perhaps as a result of this decrease in foraging efficiency. Meanwhile, in bird communities, ecologists found that increased noise led to changes in avian community composition, decreases in diversity, and even decreases in reproductive success. One study showed that to avoid noise pollutions, some birds changed the frequency of their calls. In order to understand the degree of sound that impacts species, one study found that many bird species will also alter their overall behavior (reproduction, abundance, stress hormone levels and species richness) at levels greater than or equal to 45 decibels and terrestrial mammals experienced heightened stress levels and less reproductive efficiency at noise ranging between 52 and 68 decibels. Anthropogenic noise can be characterized as intentionally produced, such as by sonars or seismic exploration (measuring seismic waves), or intentionally produced as a by-product of human activity, such as construction or traffic corridors. These studies demonstrate the importance of auditory cues and have resulted in calls for the preservation of "soundscapes", or the collective sounds of ecosystems.

Hearing is a particularly important sense for marine species. Because of low light penetration, hearing is often more useful than vision in marine environments. In addition, sound travels about five times faster in water than in land, and over greater distances. Sounds are important for the survival and reproduction of marine species. Over the last century, human activities have increasingly added sounds to water environments. These activities can impede the ability of fish to hear sounds, and can interfere with communication, predator avoidance, prey detection, and even navigation. Whales, for example, are at risk of reductions in foraging efficiency and mating opportunities as a result of noise pollution. Intense noise can also cause ear damage for whales, impacting their use of echolocation for orientation and may even startle them so badly that they engage in stranding as a flight response (commonly known as bleaching). In recent years, the creation of offshore wind turbines has led conservationists and ecologists to study how the noises produced from these turbines may affect marine species. Studies have found that the sounds created by wind turbines may have significant effects on the communication of marine mammal species such as seals and porpoises. This research has been applied to development projects. For example, a recent report assessed the risks of the acoustic changes brought on by offshore wind farms on fish communities.

=== Changes in lighting ===
Humans have strongly altered nighttime lighting. This light pollution has had serious impacts on species that rely on visual cues for navigation. One recent study of rodent communities showed that brighter nights led to community-level changes in foraging behavior; while less predator-susceptible species foraged heavily, those species susceptible to predation reduced their foraging activity as a result of their increased nighttime visibility. Birds are also heavily influenced by light pollution. For example, ecologists have found that lights on tall structures can disorient migrating birds, leading to millions of deaths each year. These findings have guided recent conservation efforts. The US Fish and Wildlife Service has created a set of guidelines to reduce the impacts of lighting on migratory birds, such as limiting tower construction, limiting the height of towers, and keeping towers away from migratory zones. In addition, Programs such as the Fatal Light Awareness Program (FLAP) in Toronto have reduced bird collisions by reducing the light emissions of tall buildings. Studies have also found that artificial lighting disrupts the orientation of baby sea turtles. This, in turn, has increased mortality in sea turtle populations.

This information has led to the proposed implementation of a number of conservation and management strategies. The same researchers, for example, have suggested pairing light reduction with dune restoration to improve hatchling orientation and success. In addition, researchers have used information on the sensory ecology of sea turtles to decrease their bycatch rate by fishermen. Bycatch is the term for non-target fish, turtles, or marine mammals that are incidentally captured by fishermen. Because researchers know that fishes and sea turtles differ in their responses to visual sensory cues, they have devised a baiting system that is non-detectable to fish, but less attractive or even repellant to sea turtles. In this recent study, this method led to decreases in turtle bycatch while imposing no noticeable reduction on fishing yield.

=== Role of sensory ecology in conservation strategies ===
A goal of sensory ecologists has been to study what environmental information is most important in determining how these organisms perceive their world. This information has been particularly relevant in understanding how organisms might respond to rapid environmental change and novel human-modified environments. Recently, scientists have called for an integration of sensory ecology into conservation and management strategies. Sensory ecology can thus be used as a tool to understand (1) why different species may react to anthropogenic and environmental change in different ways, and (2) how negative impacts of environmental and anthropogenic change might be mitigated. For example, through understanding soundscape and its ability to restore ecosystems has shown that by playing loud diverse healthy soundscapes can actually have the power to restore a once degrading coral reef. This means that these restored ecosystems are the beacon of hope for future generations of coral reefs, this supporting long-term stability and conservation management. In addition, sensory ecology has been employed as a tool to shape management strategies for the control and eradication for pests and invasive species as diverse as crop pests, marine animals, cane toads, and brown snakes. Through understanding the vastness of perceptual worlds experienced by different species, this can better inform conservation strategies to prevent ecological and sensory traps as well as reducing human-wildlife interactions. This would in turn increase the success of re-introducing species into habitats and aid in the process of capturing and releasing to protect species from potentially dangerous sites.

==== Conservation through the reduction of ecological traps ====
An ecological trap is an instance where organisms choose poor-quality habitats over better, available habitats because of their incorrect evaluation of habitat quality. Man-made landscapes present novel environments to organisms. In addition, man-made materials can be mistaken for natural materials, leading some organisms to choose poor-quality habitats over better-quality habitat locations. Sensory ecology can be used to mitigate the effects of these ecological traps by clarifying which particular information organisms are using to make "bad" decisions.

Organisms often misinterpret man-made surfaces such as asphalt and solar panels as natural surfaces. Solar panels, for example, reflect horizontally polarized light that is perceived by many insects to be water. Since insects lay their eggs in water, they will try to oviposit on the solar panels. This leads to widespread juvenile insect mortality on solar panels. To mitigate the effects of this ecological trap, researchers broke up the shape of the solar-active area on the panels. In doing so, the panels became less attractive to insects, thus reducing mortality. A number of bat species fall also prey to ecological traps that are the result of man-made surfaces. A recent study by Greif and Siemers found that bats determine water location based on the smoothness of a surface, not by actual presence of water. Bats thus attempt to drink from smooth surfaces that are not in fact water, such as glass. As a result, the bats waste energy and time, which could lead to decreases in fitness. Bird species are also often subject to ecological traps as a result of their sensory ecology. One of the recent areas of focus of avian sensory ecology has been on how birds may perceive large wind turbines and other buildings. Each year, countless birds die after colliding with power lines, fences, wind turbines, and buildings. The flight paths around these structures act as forms of ecological traps; while birds may perceive areas around buildings as "good habitat" and viable flight corridors, they can actually increase bird mortality because of collisions. Sensory ecologists have linked these ecological traps to avian sensory ecology. Researchers have found that while human vision is binocular, bird vision is much less so. In addition, birds do not possess high resolution frontal vision. As a result, birds may not see large structures directly in front of them, leading to collisions.

A number of solutions to this problem have been proposed. One study showed that the response of birds to different airport lighting schemes differed, and that bird strikes could be reduced by altering lighting patterns. Other researchers have suggested that warning sounds or visual cues placed on the ground may help reduce bird collisions. By adjusting the other sensory cues of birds, ecologists may help reduce the presence of avian ecological traps around these structures.

==== Pest control ====
In addition to using sensory ecology as a tool to inform conservation strategies, scientists have also used sensory ecology concepts and findings to inform pest management strategies. In particular, the exploitation of senses has been used to control insect, marine, and amphibious pests. Managers have used sensory ecology to create highly individualized visual, pheromonal, and chemical traps for pests.

Visual traps are important in the management of a number of insect species. For example, Tsetse flies, a vector of African Trypanosomiasis (sleeping sickness), are attracted to blue colors. Flies can therefore be lured in and killed by blue fabric traps imbued with pesticides. Scientists believe that flies are attracted to these blue fabrics because blue colors are similar to the color of the ground under a shady tree. Since flies must seek out cool places in the heat of the day, blue colors are more attractive. Exploitation of visual cues has also been used for the control of aphids and whiteflies. Many aphid species show a strong preference for yellow colors. Scientists have suggested that this may be the result of a preference for yellow leaves, which tend to have higher flows of accessible nitrogen sources.

Pheromones are species-specific chemical cues. When released, pheromones can strongly influence the behavior and physiology of other organisms of the same species. Because pheromones are largely species-specific, and because they often elicit strong behavioral responses, scientists and managers have used pheromones to lure and trap an array of species. This method has been particularly exploited in insect populations. This method has been used to capture and control species such as sugarcane weevils, gypsy moths, invasive oriental fruit flies, the bark beetle Pityogenes chalcographus, and Carpophilus spp.

== See also ==
- Biosemiotics
- Cell signalling
- Chemotaxis
- Ecology
- Ecosemiotics
- Information
- Migration (disambiguation), relevant subtopics
- Olfaction (sense of smell)
- Semiosphere
- Signalling theory
- Sound
- Stimulus (physiology)
- Taxis
- Thermotaxis
- Visual perception

== Further references ==
- Collin SP and Marshall NJ (Eds) (2003) Sensory Processing in Aquatic Environments Springer. ISBN 9780387955278.
- Stevens, Martin (2013) Sensory Ecology, Behaviour, and Evolution Oxford University Press. ISBN 9780199601783.
