= Phytosemiotics =

Branch of biosemiotics

Phytosemiotics is a branch of biosemiotics that studies the sign processing capabilities present in plants. Some functions that plants perform that utilize this simple semiosis include cellular recognition, plant perception, intercellular communication, and plant signal transduction. Comparative to the sign processing present in animals and humans, phytosemiotics occurs at the cellular level, with communication between the cells of plants acting as a means of observing their surroundings and making rudimentary decisions.

== History ==
The term 'phytosemiotics' was introduced by German psychologist and semiotician Martin Krampen, in 1981. After participating in an experiment involving a subject living in a plant-filled greenhouse, Krampen became interested in the semiotic processing capabilities of plants. After consulting the works of Jakob von Uexküll, in particular his 'Theory of Meaning', Krampen further developed this concept and eventually wrote "Phytosemiotics", the first essay covering the topic.

== Comparisons with zoosemiotics ==
Despite the fundamentally different biological systems that make up animals and plants, there are comparisons to be made in the ways they undergo semiotics. One possible similarity is the presence of vegetative semiotics within plants as well as animals, as intercellular communication is an important aspect of all life. Another example is the ability to distinguish which aspects in the immediate environment of a creature (also known as their 'umwelt') are important to their survival and which ones are not. While plants do not have an umwelt in the traditional sense, they are able to deduce what surrounding resources are important to them and which ones are not.

An important aspect of phytosemiotics is understanding how plants undergo semiosis differently from how animals experience it. One important difference is the lack of 'receptor' and 'effector' organs in plants, unlike animals who are able to see their environment and interact with it in a more direct way than plants are. While plants may not have traditional receptor or effector organs in the same way animals do, plants do use signal transduction to send external signals throughout the plant to make simple decisions. Another important difference is the types of signs plants are able to process. While plants can only process indexes, animals can also process icons and humans can further process symbols.

== Controversy ==
The addition of phytosemiotics into the broader scale of semiotic research remains a controversial one, as determining the extent to which plants actually exhibit sign processing remains a debate, as the range of what signs are able to be processed by plants remains fairly limited compared to the semiotic capabilities of humans or animals. The lack of ability to process icons due to not having receptor organs makes the semiotics of plants fundamentally different from semiosis in animals.

Another challenge in legitimizing phytosemiotics as a field of study in semiotics is the blurring of lines between animal life and plant life. In researching plant biology there is a risk of prescribing human traits onto plants. This fact makes discerning the legitimacy of plant semiosis and plant communication difficult. However, if fully recognized, phytosemiotics could expand semiotic research beyond a focus on human or animal semiotics into the other kingdoms of life, including fungi and bacteria. It could also change how we view the components that make up effective sign processing and how non-human/animal life is capable of more advanced sign processing.

== See also ==
- Plant perception (physiology)
- Plant communication
- Plant intelligence
- Zoosemiotics
- International Society for Biosemiotic Studies
