= Neurosemiotics =

Area of science

Neurosemiotics is an area of science which studies the neural aspects of meaning making. It interconnects neurobiology, biosemiotics and cognitive semiotics. Neurolinguistics, neuropsychology and neurosemantics can be seen as parts of neurosemiotics.

== Description ==
The pioneers of neurosemiotics include Jakob von Uexküll, Kurt Goldstein, Friedrich Rothschild, and others.

The first graduate courses on neurosemiotics were taught in some American and Canadian universities since 1970s. The term 'neurosemiotics' is also not much older.

Neurosemiotics demonstrates which are the necessary conditions and processes responsible for semiosis in the neural tissue. It also describes the differences in the complexity of meaning making in animals of different complexity of the nervous system and the brain.

== See also ==
- Semiotics
- Zoosemiotics
