= Jesper Hoffmeyer =

Danish biologist (1942–2019)

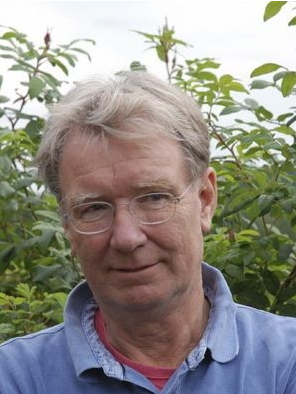
Hoffmeyer in 2010

Jesper Hoffmeyer (21 February 1942 – 25 September 2019) was a professor at the University of Copenhagen Institute of Biology, and a leading figure in the emerging field of biosemiotics. He was the president of the International Society for Biosemiotic Studies (ISBS) from 2005 to 2015, co-editor of the journal Biosemiotics and the Springer Book series in Biosemiotics. He authored the books Biosemiotics: An Examination into the Signs of Life and the Life of Signs and Signs of Meaning in the Universe and edited A Legacy for Living Systems: Gregory Bateson as Precursor to Biosemiotics.

== Biography ==
Jesper Hoffmeyer was born in Slangerup, Denmark in 1942. He received his Cand. Scient. in biochemistry from the University of Copenhagen in 1967, and from 1967-1968 he was Science Fellow at the Institut de Biochemie Génerale et Comparée of the Collège de France, Paris.

He began his teaching career in 1968 as an assistant professor at the University of Copenhagen's Institute for Biological Chemistry, where he became an associate professor in 1972, and served as the Head of the Institute from 1978-1980. Hoffmeyer was the recipient of the Poul Henningsen Award in 1985, the 1991 Mouton d’Or Award, and named a Thomas Sebeok Fellow by the Semiotic Society of America on the occasion of its 25th annual meeting in 2000.

Hoffmeyer was awarded a doctorate in philosophy (Dr. Phil.) at Aarhus University in 2005, and since 2007 has served as president of the International Society for Biosemiotic Studies.

Since 2009, Hoffmeyer was a professor emeritus at the University of Copenhagen.

== Life and work ==
Jesper Hoffmeyer's research interests changed considerably through the years. An early engagement in the social and political consequences of his own discipline, biochemistry, led him in the 1970s to take up studies of the technological, ecological and historical dimensions of science. The results of these investigations can be found in his 1982 book Samfundets naturhistorie (The Natural History of Society).

At the same time, Hoffmeyer also embarked upon a parallel track of inquiry, based on a growing awareness that the reductionist tendencies of modern biology and science systematically legitimized and guided the technological horizon towards developments that were inherently damaging to natural systems, including that of human health. This inquiry led him towards questions of theoretical biology and philosophy. Eventually these two research tracks ran together, when, in a collaboration with Claus Emmeche, he initiated an analysis of the concepts of information in both its bio-ontological dimension, as well as in its applied contexts dealing with biological (e.g. genetic) and cultural information, and the then-upcoming 'smart' information and biotechnologies

Hoffmeyer traced much of the development of his thinking during this period to the semiotic traditions of the late 1980s, as well as to such scientific systems theorists as Gregory Bateson, Michael Polanyi, Anthony Wilden, Howard H. Pattee and Peder Voetmann Christiansen. Eventually making the acquaintance of Thomas Sebeok in the United States, Thure von Uexküll in Germany and Kalevi Kull in Estonia, by the beginning of the 1990s, Hoffmeyer had formulated a new programme for a scientific biology that would define life as a signbased phenomenon. Hoffmeyer's first comprehensive essay outlining this of biosemiotics and its implication for a non-dualist understanding of the embodied self was his Signs of Meaning in the Universe (in Danish, En snegl på vejen, 1993).

Beginning in 2001, when the yearly annual international ‘Gatherings in Biosemiotics’ conferences began, Hoffmeyer became a central figure in establishing biosemiotics as a scientific cross-disciplinary field, assembling scientists and humanities scholars to jointly investigate how a semiotic analysis can inform current biological thinking, and how the findings of biology provide general semiotics with a firmer ground for the naturalization of 'meaning'.

In 2005, Hoffmeyer was conferred with a Danish doctoral degree for his treatise Biosemiotics: An Examination into the Signs of Life and the Life of Signs. Translated into an English-language edition in 2008, this work examines the semiotics of living nature, from the origin of life with its self-organizing code-duality in evolution and development, to the complex endosemiosis of living bodies, to the ‘semiotic niches’ in ecosystems, and the species-specific peculiarities of human semiosis, such as language.

== Important concepts ==
Semiotic freedom. The increase in 'depth' of meaning that can be communicated or interpreted.

Semiome. In biosemiotics: the entirety of semiotic tool sets available to the species.

Semiotic scaffolding operates by assuring higher level performance through semiotic interactions inside a living system or between living systems and cue elements in their environment.

== Selected publications ==
- Signs of Meaning in the Universe. Indiana University Press, USA, 1996.
- A Special Issue of Semiotica vol. 120 (no.3-4), 1998 devoted to the release of Signs of Meaning, includes 13 reviews of the book and a rejoinder by the author.
- Biosemiotics. An Examination into the Signs of Life and the Life of Signs, University of Scranton Press, Scranton PA, USA, 2008.
- A Legacy for Living Systems. Gregory Bateson as Precursor to Biosemiotics. Dordrecht, Springer 2008.
- Semiotic Freedom: an Emerging Force in Davis, Paul and Gregersen, Niels Henrik (eds.): Information and the Nature of Reality. From Physics to Metaphysics, Cambridge University Press, Cambridge, 185-204, 2010
- Baldwin and Biosemiotics: What Intelligence Is For. In: Bruce H. Weber and David J. Depew (eds.): Evolution and Learning - The Baldwin Effect Reconsidered'. The MIT Press, Cambridge, USA, 2003. (co-authored by Kalevi Kull)

== Festschrifts ==
- Emmeche, Claus; Kull, Kalevi; Stjernfelt, Frederik 2002. Reading Hoffmeyer, Rethinking Biology. (Tartu Semiotics Library 3.) Tartu: Tartu University Press.
- Favareau, Donald; Cobley, Paul; Kull, Kalevi (eds.) 2012. A More Developed Sign: Interpreting the Work of Jesper Hoffmeyer. (Tartu Semiotics Library 10.) Tartu: Tartu University Press.
