= Semiosphere =

Conceptual sphere of semiotic activity

The semiosphere is a concept in cultural semiotics and biosemiotic theory, according to which—contrary to ideas of nature determining sense and experience—the phenomenal world is a creative and logical structure of processes of semiosis where signs operate together to produce sense and experience.

== Overview ==
Biosemiotic theorists regard the idea of the semiosphere as beginning with continental philosophers' recognition of an epistemological gap between the ontological and the ontic, where it is initially difficult to conceptualize the way that subjectivity is created in between them. The study of the semiosphere has often overlapped into research made by symbolic interactionists and field theorists. The subject's narrative boundary-understanding of its environment—the lifeworld as proposed by Edmund Husserl, or umwelt as proposed by Jakob Johann von Uexküll—is derived through abstract processes of making a phenomenal world of symptoms, signals, icons, indexes, symbols and names—as proposed by Charles Sanders Peirce—from the semiosphere's code for interacting with and creating meaning from other umwelt. An analogical concept is Deleuze and Guattari's societal extraction of surplus value of code, where subjects sporadically extract signs—which are externalized as acts and traits—from the code that makes up their environment.

=== Semiospheric theory ===
One proposed solution to the socio-spatial problem of mind–body dualism is of a narrative structure within four-dimensional space, which the idea of the semiosphere makes cohesive. The concept of the process of semiosis has foundations in a variety of continental philosophers; in particular, the common denominators between Freudian unconscious and Jungian unconscious are mythic structures.

Roland Barthes' definition of myth is the semiological self-mythology derived from everyday life (news, entertainment, advertisements), with its own codes and "whistles". The present-I-sign interacts with others through the future-You-interpretant to retroactively form the past-Me-object.

A diagram of the semiospheric relation could be rendered as:

Signifying Act [present-I]: Sign: (Symbolic Meaning [interpretant])/(Vocal Gesture [future-You]) (Meaning [Connotation])/(Object [past-Me])

Mikhail Bakhtin's chronotope, or time-space (deterministic) makes outside-the-semiosphere (unintelligible) information relevant to the semiosphere through narrative structure. Time (affects-passing) takes on a protagonist's sensory nervous system (Umwelt), based on the "difficult journey" of the monad-sign-operator actively reading and interpreting co-occurring ontological text (signs) that parallel the co-occurring ontic (unintelligible) objects.

The adventure chronotope is thus characterized by a technical, abstract connection between space and time, by the reversibility of moments in a temporal sequence, and by their interchangeability in space. ...Every concretization, of even the most simple and everyday variety, would introduce its own rule-generating force, its own order, its inevitable ties to human life and to the time specific to that life. ...Biographical time is not reversible vis-à-vis the events of life itself, which are inseparable from historical events. But with regard to character, such time is reversible[.]

— Mikhail Bakhtin

In the semiotic theory of Charles Sanders Peirce, there are trichotomic phenomenological categories: Firstness (feeling), Secondness (relatability) and Thirdness (representation and interpretation). The lifeworld or umwelt is a cognitive space of semiosis (hermeneutic circle of text (signs))—generating polysemy from processing multiple sets of code (semiotics). Jesper Hoffmeyer has suggested a conscience collective variation of the semiosphere derived from parasitism and not bound by linguistics, devoid of the social alienation of mind–body dualism.

A type of dysphoria, or symptom, occurs from cognitive dissonance created by a harmonic dissonance occurring between the semiosphere and the umwelten (or, the here-and-now umwelt). A metatext can form out of a historical object/sign, like tea, and the mythopoetics surrounding it.

==== Semiosphere sub-scapes ====
The emergent soundscape is a facet (geometry) of the semiosphere, or plane (geometry) of the Umwelt.

===== Existential therapy =====
Existential therapy utilizes the following sub-dimensions of Dasein (or Being-in-the-world):

- Lebenswelt (beings-in-the-world)
  - Umwelt (physical world)
  - Mitwelt (social fate-world)
  - Eigenwelt (self-relatedness world)
  - Überwelt (spiritual world).

== Soft architecture ==
A semiosphere includes "physical, energetic and material phenomena" that get turned into neural signals and which contribute to processes of neuroplasticity. Common representations of the semiosphere are as universes, arts museum halls, or mind palaces. Semiotics studies aesthetics and architecture, among many other fields.

Influenced by Office for Metropolitan Architecture, acting as a type of post-modern flâneuse, the 'pataphysical poet Lisa Robertson has researched the aboutness of a city's semiosphere by parodying "reductionist scientific analysis". Another notable figure is Erín Moure.

=== Atmosphere ===
Soft architecture's observational focal point is the observer's sense organs. The self-world can have an atmosphere that has a mood. Meaning can come from atmosphere. The origin point of a semiosphere etherealizes itself in the atmosphere of its environment; the umwelt uses monosemy to derive polysemy from the process of encoding and encoding. An implication of the semiosphere is also the emergence of something that is more than the sum of its parts; at its largest, it becomes a global village, or second-degree semiosphere.

==== The room ====
The concept of the room in stand-up performance is a specific artistic rendering of the sociology of space within a specific social space and has historically been used in casual social interactions and niche places such as pleasure gardens and traversable art installations.

== Digital semiosphere ==
John Hartley, Indrek Ibrus and Maarja Ojamaa built on the original concepts of biosphere (Vladimir Vernadsky) and semiosphere (Juri Lotman) and linked these to the studies of cultural globalisation, datafication, platformisation, mediatisation and the evolution of digital culture. They demonstrated how the semiosphere could be seen as a causal force shaping not only global communications and political fluctuations, but also the biosphere and geosphere and such also the evolving Anthropocene.

== History ==
The term semiosphere is a neologism coined by Juri Lotman in analogy to Vladimir Vernadsky's concepts of biosphere and noosphere and Mikhail Bakhtin's concept of logosphere. It was first introduced in a 1984 essay "On the semiosphere", and then further elaborated in the collection of Lotman's writings published in English under the title "Universe of the Mind: A Semiotic Theory of Culture." Just as Vernadsky revolutionised the field of biogeochemistry by considering not individual organisms but the whole of life as a single, living matter devoted to a single function, and inhabiting a single functional space, the biosphere, Lotman proposed a similar revision of the main concepts of semiotics by beginning his investigation not from the single texts, but from the space where all these texts exist. Therefore he definied the semiosphere as the "semiotic space, outside of which semiosis itself cannot exist."

Some critics see Lotman as having difficulties in abstracting semiosphere from biosphere and as characterizing semiospheres as feminine and inert, needing to be penetrated with information.

== Discussion ==
Kalevi Kull argues that this suggestion is not consistent with the nature of semiosis which can only be a product of the behaviour of the organisms in the environment. It is the organisms that create the signs which become the constituent parts of the semiosphere. This is not an adaptation to the existing environment, but the continuous creation of a new environment. Kull believes that it is only possible to accept Hoffmeyer's view as an analogy to the concept of an ecological niche as it is traditionally used in biology, so that the community develops according to the semiotic understanding of the processes which are responsible for the building of Umwelt.

=== Discussion bibliography ===
- Kull, Kalevi. "On Semiosis, Umwelt, and Semiosphere". Semiotica vol. 120(3/4), pp. 299–310. (1998)
- Lotman, Yuri M. "Universe of the mind: a semiotic theory of culture" (Translated by A. Shukman) (1990)London & New York: I. B. Tauris & Co Ltd.
- Lotman, Yuri M. "O semiosfere". Sign Systems Studies (Trudy po znakovym sistemam) vol. 17, pp. 5–23. (1984)
- Lotman, Juri On the semiosphere. (Translated by Wilma Clark) Sign Systems Studies, 33.1 (2005)
- Tataru, Ludmila, and José Angel García Landa (eds.). Семиосфера нарратологии: диалог языков и культур / Semiosphere of Narratology: A Dialogue of Languages and Cultures. Balashov: Nikolaiev. (2013)

== See also ==
- Hyperreality
- Method of loci
- Simulacrum
