= Merkwelt =

Concept in robotics and biology

The merkwelt (German: Merkwelt, meaning "way of viewing the world", "peculiar individual consciousness") is a concept in robotics, ethology and biology that describes a creature or android's capacity to view things, manipulate information and synthesize to make meaning out of the universe. In biology, for example, a shark's merkwelt for instance is dominated by smell due to its enlarged olfactory lobes whilst a bat's is dominated by its hearing, especially at ultrasonic frequencies.

This term was particularly developed by the German biologist Jakob von Uexküll who framed it as part of his theory of umwelt. This basically stated that any living 'observer' of the broader environment or umwelt through their particular werkwelt or 'mechanical viewing' (that is to say, the organs through which they view the world- their eyes, ears, mouth etc. in humans and electrical sensors in sharks for instance) could have a merkwelt or 'perceptual universe'.

The term has not achieved wide currency, but has been used by several influential writers, including the ethologist Nikolaas Tinbergen and the roboticist Rodney Brooks.
