= French Zoosemiotics Society =

Academic society

French Zoosemiotics Society (French: Société Française de Zoosémiotique) is an academic society, uniting ethologists, zoologists, semioticians (including biosemioticians and ecosemioticians), linguists, veterinarians and philosophers, and promoting a semiotic approach in zoosemiotics and animal studies.

The focus of the society is to promote and facilitate research in animal communication, their intraspecific and interspecific sign systems, as well as human-animal communication studies.

The Society was established in 2018 by scholars of Sorbonne University, National Museum of Natural History, and other universities and institutions in France.

This is seemingly the first zoosemiotics society in the world.

The founding president of the Society is Astrid Guillaume.

== See also ==
- International Society for Biosemiotic Studies
