= Cognitive semiotics =

Study model of meaning-making

Cognitive semiotics is the study model of meaning-making, applying methods and theories from semiotics, linguistics, psychology, cognitive science, computational modeling, anthropology, philosophy and other sciences. Contrary to classical cognitive science, cognitive semiotics is explicitly involved with questions of meaning, having recourse, when possible, to semiotic terminology, although developing it when necessary. As against classical semiotics, cognitive semiotics aims to incorporate the results of other sciences, using methods ranging from conceptual and textual analysis as well as experimental and ethnographic investigations.

== History ==
Cognitive semiotics has many sources. The first person to suggest the integration of the cognitive sciences and semiotics seems to have been Thomas C. Daddesio (1994). The Argentinean researcher Juan Magariños de Morentin has long been using the term "cognitive semiotics" to describe his own Peircean approach to semiotics (missing direct reference dating first time using "cognitive semiotics"). This is also the name of a web forum which he directed for many years. Several other prominent semioticians have been known to subscribe to a cognitive approach, such as Irene Mittelberg in gesture studies and Jean-Marie Klinkenberg and the Groupe Mu in pictorial and general semiotics.

Per Aage Brandt founded a Center for Semiotics in 1995 at Aarhus University and subsequently a Master Education in Cognitive Semiotics, to investigate the connections between semiotics and cognitive science (with a strong focus on cognitive linguistics), and he has had several followers along this line such as Line Brandt (Center for Semiotics at Aarhus University), and Todd Oakley (Case Western Reserve University). The Center for Semiotics is currently constituted by Frederik Stjernfelt, Peer Bundgaard, Mikkel Wallentin, Svend Østergaard, Riccardo Fusaroli and Kristian Tylén. Bundgaard published an anthology in Danish which brings together texts from cognitive science, cognitive linguistics, and semiotics. Stjernfelt has combined the inspiration from Peirce with that from Husserl. Wallentin is conducting neuro-imaging investigations. Tylén and Fusaroli develop behavioral and neuroscientific experimental approaches to sign usage and linguistic conversations.

Since 2009, there is also a Centre for Cognitive Semiotics (CCS) at Lund University (Sweden), which is headed by Göran Sonesson, who has long been working in the direction of cognitive semiotics, integrating semiotic theory with experimental studies, mainly with application to the study of pictures. Sonesson started collaborating with the linguist Jordan Zlatev around 2001 and organized a number of research project together with him, before adopting the label "cognitive semiotics". Other members of the CCS are, notably, Mats Andrén, who has published a number of gesture studies, partially in collaboration with Zlatev, and Sara Lenninger, who is working with Sonesson on the semiotics of pictures. The particular direction taken by cognitive semiotics in Lund consists in experimental studies which are geared to elucidate fundamental semiotic concepts such as sign, index, icon, etc., as well as their precursor notion such as imitation, mimesis, empathy and intersubjectivity. The research at CCS centers on the phylogeny and ontogeny of human semiosis, employing apes and children, respectively, as research subjects.

== Journal of Cognitive Semiotics ==
An international journal on cognitive semiotics, (Journal of) Cognitive Semiotics (JCS) – Multidisciplinary Journal on Meaning and Mind, was started in Denmark in 2005. Its inaugural issue, edited by Lars Andreassen, Line Brandt and Jes Vang, was published in 2007 (spring). In the fall of 2007, the first peer-reviewed issue, a theme issue on ‘Consciousness & Semiosis’ (eds. Per Aage Brandt and Jakob Simonsen), was published, with funding from Case Western Reserve University. The editorial board consisted of Line Brandt, Per Aage Brandt, Frank Kjørup, Todd Oakley, Jacob Orquin, Jakob Simonsen and Jes Vang. Since then, many issues have been published, in part by Peter Lang, and in part online, available from the journal web site. From 2014, the journal has been published by Mouton de Gruyter. The present board consists of Peer Bundgaard, Göran Sonesson, Todd Oakley, Merlin Donald, and Bruno Gantolucci.

The journal's website states: "The first of its kind, Cognitive Semiotics is a multidisciplinary journal devoted to high quality research, integrating methods and theories developed in the disciplines of cognitive science with methods and theories developed in semiotics and the humanities, with the ultimate aim of providing new insights into the realm of human signification and its manifestation in cultural practices."

The International Association for Cognitive Semiotics (IACS) was initiated during the conference of the Nordic Association for Semiotics Studies (NASS) in Lund in 2011, and officially founded during the conference of NASS in Aarhus in May 2013. The Journal of Cognitive Semiotics then became the official organ of the IACS. The first official conference of IACS took place in Lund in 2014, and the second conference was organized in Lublin in 2014. Selected papers from the Lund conference were published at Peter Lang at the end of 2016 (https://www.peterlang.com/view/product/22221), and the acts of the Lublin conference will appear as a thematic issue of the journal "Philosophy and Science”, published by the Polish Academy of Sciences.

== Cognitive Semiotics of Film ==
Cognitive Semiotics of Film is a monograph written by Warren S. Buckland. Within the monograph, Warren Buckland argues that the conflict between cognitive film theory and contemporary film theory is unproductive. Cognitive semiotics of film is a neglected branch of film theory that works together with the terms linguistics and semiotics. Cognitive science is also incorporated in a combination with linguistics and semiotics to form what is called cognitive semiotics.

== See also ==
- Biosemiotics
- Film theory
- Film semiotics
- Linguistics
- Semiotics
- Monograph
- Cognitive Semantics
- Francesco Casetti
- Christian Metz (critic)
