= Timo Maran =

Estonian biosemiotician and poet

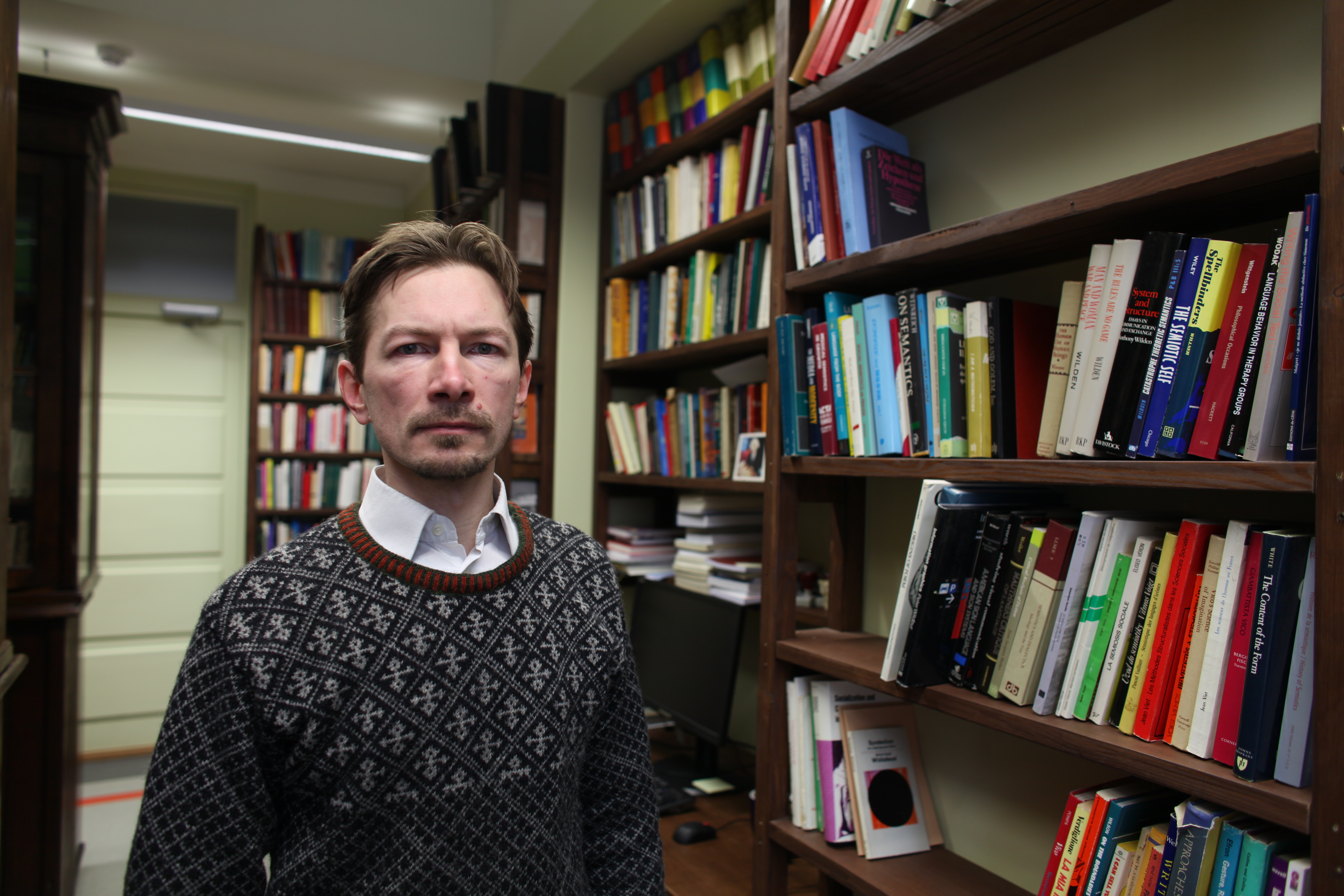
Timo Maran

Timo Maran (born 13 April 1975) is an Estonian biosemiotician and poet. He has remarkably contributed to zoosemiotics and ecosemiotics.

In 2012-2024, he was the head of the Department of Semiotics, University of Tartu.

Membership in organizations:

- Estonian Naturalists' Society (vice-president 2007–2010)
- Estonian Semiotics Association (vice-chairman 2006–2008, 2010–2012)
- Estonian Literary Society
- Estonian Writers' Union
- European Association for the Study of Literature, Culture and Environment (member of advisory board since 2010)
- International Society for Biosemiotic Studies (member of the executive board 2010–2012, vice-president since 2012)
- Nordic Association for Semiotic Studies (member of the board 2011-...)

== Works ==
- 2001 poetry collection "Põhjavesi" (Erakkond)
- 2007 poetry collection "Metsa pööramine" (Erakkond)
- 2007 poetry collection "Poeetiline punane raamat / Poetics of Endangered Species" (Ukraina Kultuurikeskus, Ajakirjade Kirjastus)
- 2015 poetry collection "Las ma ümisen" (Allikaäärne)
- 2015 children stories "Kodukakk, päevakoer ja teised" (Päike ja Pilv)
- 2017 monograph "Mimicry and Meaning: Structure and Semiotics of Biological Mimicry" (Springer)
- 2019 poetry collection "Metsloomatruudus" (Elusamus)
- 2020 monograph "Ecosemiotics. The Study of Signs in Changing Ecologies" (Cambridge University Press)
- 2023 collection of selected poems "Ainult puudutused on" (Verb)
