= Sign Systems Studies =

Academic journal on semiotics

- Discipline: Semiotics
- Language: English (Estonian and any other language for abstracts)
- Edited by: Ott Puumeister, Kalevi Kull, Ene-Reet Soovik, Timo Maran, Silvi Salupere, Mihhail Lotman, Maarja Ojamaa

Publication details
- Former name: Trudy po Znakovym Sistemam
- History: 1964–present
- Publisher: University of Tartu Press (Estonia)
- Frequency: Quarterly

Standard abbreviations
- ISO 4: Sign Syst. Stud.

Indexing
- ISSN: 1406-4243
- LCCN: sn99034172
- OCLC no.: 41123942

Links
- Journal homepage; Online access; Open access (all issues, since 1964)

Sign Systems Studies is a peer-reviewed academic journal on semiotics edited at the Department of Semiotics of the University of Tartu and published by the University of Tartu Press. It is the oldest periodical in the field. It was initially published in Russian and since 1998 in English with Russian and Estonian language abstracts, and since 2022 with abstract in whichever language of the world. The journal was established by Juri Lotman as Trudy po Znakovym Sistemam in 1964. Since 1998 it has been edited by Kalevi Kull, Mihhail Lotman, and Peeter Torop. Since 2022, Ott Puumeister leads the editorial team. The journal is available online from the Philosophy Documentation Center, indexed by WoS and Scopus, and starting 2012 also on an open access platform, as diamond open access.

The vol. 50(4) published the complete list of contributions (1964–2022).

Since the vol. 50(2/3) the articles are supplied by an abstract in freely chosen language (in addition to English and Estonian abstracts).

== See also ==
- Biosemiotics (journal)
- Copenhagen–Tartu school of biosemiotics
- Semiotica
- Tartu-Moscow Semiotic School
