= Marcello Barbieri =

Italian theoretical biologist

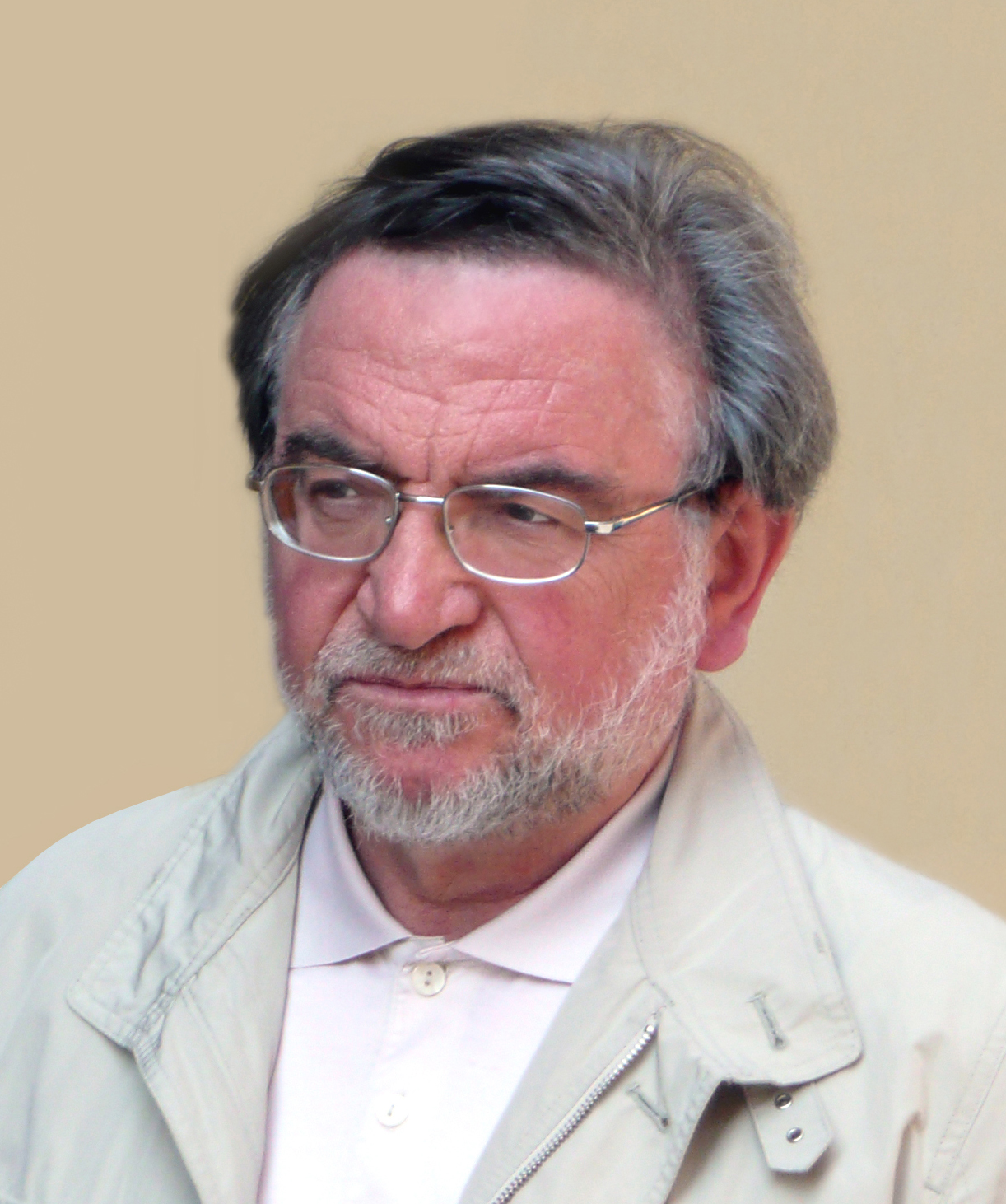

Marcello Barbieri (born 1940) is an Italian theoretical biologist at the University of Ferrara whose main interest is the origin of novelties in macroevolution. He has been one of founders and first editor-in-chief of the journal Biosemiotics until 2012; currently, he is an editor of the journal BioSystems. His research field is code biology, the study of all codes of life from the genetic code to the codes of culture. His major books are The Semantic Theory of Evolution (1985), The Organic Codes (2003), and Code Biology. A New Science of Life (2015).

== Career ==
Barbieri graduated in 1964 from the Science Faculty of Bologna University. In 1965, he was employed by the Medical Faculty of the same University as a researcher in molecular biology and teacher of biophysics for medical students. He conducted research at the Medical Research Council in Cambridge, the National Institutes of Health in Bethesda, and the Max Planck Institute of Molecular Cell Biology and Genetics in Berlin. Since 1992 he is professor of embryology at the Medical Faculty of Ferrara University. In 1997, he founded the Italian Association for Theoretical Biology (Associazione Italiana di Biologia Teorica) and in 2012 he founded the International Society of Code Biology.

== Research ==
At the Max-Planck-Institut in Berlin, Barbieri obtained the largest microcrystals of eukaryotic ribosomes that have ever appeared in the scientific literature. At the Medical Research Council in Cambridge, and at the National Institutes of Health in Bethesda, he developed mathematical models for the reconstruction of structures from incomplete information and has shown that a convergent increase in complexity is possible if the reconstructions are performed with iterative methods that make use of memories and codes. He has proposed that the existence of organic codes is revealed by the presence of adaptors and has shown that such codes exist in signal transduction, in the cytoskeleton and in cell compartments. This adaptor-dependent definition of code has been used by Kühn and Hofmeyr to show that the histone code is a true organic code, whereas Gérard Battail has argued that "Barbieri's organic codes enable error correction of genomes". He has been described as one of 'key figures' in biosemiotics by Donald Favareau in Essential Readings, by Liz Else in New Scientist and by Nigel Williams in Current Biology.

== Theoretical work ==
Barbieri underlined that copying and coding are two fundamentally different mechanisms of molecular change and suggested that there are two distinct mechanisms of evolutionary change: evolution by natural selection, based on copying, and evolution by natural conventions, based on coding. This in turn implies that many organic codes appeared in the history of life after the genetic code, and Barbieri proposed that the greatest novelties of macroevolution were associated with the origin of new codes. These ideas have been developed in the course of a thirty-year period in the books: The Semantic Theory of Evolution (1985), The Organic Codes (2003) and Code Biology (2015).
