= Sign system =

Concept in semiotics

A sign system is a key concept in semiotics and is used to refer to any system of signs and relations between signs. The term language is frequently used as a synonym for a sign-system. However, the term sign-system is considered preferable to the term language for a number of reasons. First, the use of the term language tends to carry with it connotations of human language, particularly human spoken language. Human spoken language is only one example of a sign-system, albeit probably one of the most complex sign-systems known. In traditional forms of face-to-face communication, humans communicate through non-verbal as well as verbal sign-systems; colloquially, this can be referred to as body language. Hence, humans communicate a great deal by way of facial movements and other forms of bodily expression. Such expressions are also signs and an organised collection of such signs would be considered a sign system.

Tone of voice in spoken communication, conveys meaning. Depending on tone, a phrase can have several meanings; e.g. "you like that" can mean the speaker believes the listener likes something, or it can be a question, or it can convey disbelief.

Traffic signs, art, and fashion are all examples of sign systems.

Second, the same concept of a sign-system can be used in considering a vast range of communication forms such as animal communication, man-machine communication, machine to machine communication, and disease symptoms. Examination of simpler forms of such systems of signs within non-human communication can help to illuminate some of the essence of communication and in particular can help to provide tentative answers to the question of the nature and function of communication.

== See also ==
- Sign Systems Studies (journal)
