= Kalevi Kull =

Estonian biologist and semiotician

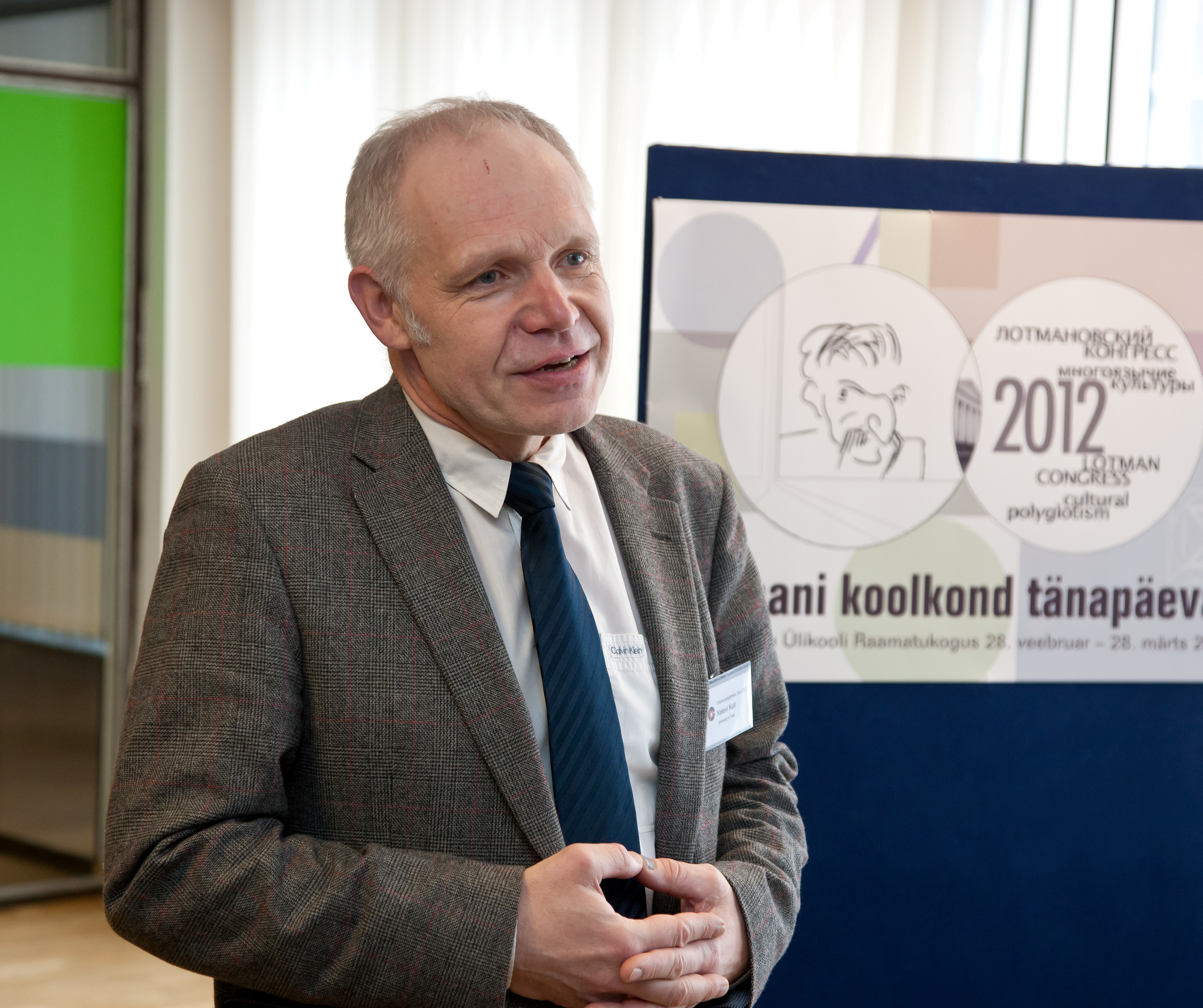
Kull in 2012

Kalevi Kull (born 12 August 1952 in Tartu) is a biosemiotics professor at the University of Tartu, Estonia.

He graduated from the University of Tartu in 1975. His earlier work dealt with ethology and field ecology. He has studied the mechanisms of species coexistence in species-rich communities and developed mathematical modelling in ecophysiology. Since 1975, he has been the main organiser of annual meetings of theoretical biology in Estonia. In 1992, he became a Professor of Ecophysiology in the University of Tartu. In 1997, he joined the Department of Semiotics, and became a Professor in Biosemiotics. From 2006 to 2018, he was the Head of the Department of Semiotics in the University of Tartu, Estonia. His field of interests include biosemiotics, ecosemiotics, general semiotics, theoretical biology, theory of evolution, history and philosophy of semiotics and life science.

He was the president of the Estonian Naturalists' Society in 1991–1994. He is a founder of the Jakob von Uexküll Centre. He is the president of the International Society for Biosemiotic Studies since 2015.

Ecologist Olevi Kull was his younger brother.

== Editorship ==
Kull is the co-editor of the journal Sign Systems Studies and book series Semiotics, Communication and Cognition (De Gruyter), Biosemiotics (Springer), Tartu Semiotics Library, and Approaches to Culture Theory (University of Tartu Press). He is a member of editorial board of the journals Semiotica, Biosemiotics, Ecokritike, Punctum: International Journal of Semiotics, and others.

== Important concepts ==
- Biosemiotic concept of species. A species concept based on recognition window of organisms, which is responsible for intraspecific variability range and the minimum width of hiatus.
- Recognition window. The range of mediated fitting (semiotic fitting), as based on the scope of indistinguishability.
- Semiotic fitting. The agent’s capacity for making and preserving the local semiotic bonds, meaning the agent’s functional or communicational match with its surrounding.
- Emon. A type of sign that is based on imitation (as different from symbol which is based on convention, or index which is based on association, or icon which is based on indistinguishability).
- Umweb. Non-momentary or diachronic or distributed umwelt.

== Selected publications ==
- Emmeche, Claus; Kull, Kalevi (eds.) (2011). Towards a Semiotic Biology: Life is the Action of Signs. London: Imperial College Press.
- Kull, Kalevi 2001. Jakob von Uexküll: An introduction. Semiotica 134(1/4): 1–59.
- Kull, Kalevi; Deacon, Terrence; Emmeche, Claus; Hoffmeyer, Jesper; Stjernfelt, Frederik 2009. Theses on biosemiotics: Prolegomena to a theoretical biology. Biological Theory 4(2): 167–173.
- Kull, Kalevi 2023. Choices by organisms: on the role of freedom in behaviour and evolution. Biological Journal of the Linnean Society 139(4): 555–562.

== Festschrifts ==
- Maran, Timo; Lindström, Kati; Magnus, Riin; Tønnessen, Morten (eds.) 2012. Semiotics in the Wild: Essays in Honour of Kalevi Kull on the Occasion of his 60th Birthday. Tartu: University of Tartu Press.
- Favareau, Donald; Velmezova, Ekaterina (eds.) 2022. Tunne loodust! Knowing Nature in the Languages of Biosemiotics. (Epistemologica et historiographica linguistica Lausannensia 4.) Lausanne: Université de Lausanne.

== Eponymous species ==
In 2021, a Costa Rican braconid wasp species new to science, Hymenochaonia kalevikulli Sharkey & van Achterberg, was named for Dr. Kull.
