= Friedrich S. Rothschild =

German psychiatrist and semiotician (1899–1995)

Friedrich Salomon Rothschild (December 17, 1899, Giessen – March 6, 1995, Israel) was a German psychiatrist and semiotician. He has coined the term "biosemiotic" in his work of 1962.

He worked in Heidelberg (from 1925 to 1928) with psychotherapist Frieda Fromm-Reichmann (1889–1957) and psychoanalyst Erich Fromm (1900–1980), and in Frankfurt (from 1928 to 1933) with Kurt Goldstein (1878–1965). He was influenced by the philosophy of Ludwig Klages (1872–1956) with whom he corresponded.

In 1935, he published the book Symbolik des Hirnbaus: Erscheinungswissenschaftliche Untersuchung über den Bau und die Funktionen des Zentralnervensystems der Wirbeltiere und des Menschen. He has developed the communicative approach in biology.

== Early life ==
Friedrich Salomon Rothschild was born to a Jewish family in Giessen, Germany, on December 17, 1899. His father was a merchant who sold his goods in the neighboring villages, and up until second grade Rothschild wished to follow in his father’s footsteps. However, Rothschild’s parents were determined that their son hone his intellectual gifts, so starting from the third-grade he attended a Realgymnasium. Rothschild graduated top of his high school class in 1918; for the next six months he served in the military, eventually working under the chief doctor of the army to further his medical studies.

== Career ==
From 1923 to 1924, Friedrich S. Rothschild began to specialize in psychiatry, completing his studies at the University Clinic of Giessen and insane asylum located in Hezberge, Berlin. By 1925 Rothschild was working with psychotherapist Frieda Fromm-Reichmann (1889–1957) at the Weißer Hirsch sanatorium in Heidelberg. Their research focused on an analysis of Erich Fromm (1900–1980), a student of psychoanalysis also working under Reichmann. During this time, Rothschild also worked as a volunteer at the Heidelberg Psychiatric Polyclinic under August Homburger, a child psychiatrist. From 1928 to 1930, Rothschild continued his neurological studies under the guidance of Kurt Goldstein (1878–1965) at the Neurological Institute of the University of Frankfurt; around this time, he exchanged letters with Ludwig Klages (1872–1956). From 1930 to 1933, Rothschild continued to work in Frankfurt as an assistant doctor, and at this point in time he began to write his first book. Rothschild’s work was published in 1935 by Karger-Verlag as Symbolik des Hirnbaus: Erscheinungswissenschaftliche Untersuchung über den Bau und die Funktionen des Zentralnervensystems der Wirbeltiere und des Menschen, just a year before he would emigrate to Israel to escape Nazi persecution. Friedrich Rothschild married Margot Hellmuth in 1936, and the couple moved to Jerusalem where Rothschild could focus on psychiatric research. By 1948 Rothschild was working as a consultant at Hadassah University Hospital. In November of 1949, Rothschild published »Das Ich und die Regulationen des Erlebnisvorganges«, and subsequently in 1958, »Das Zentralnervensystem als Symbol des Erlebens«.

In 1961 F.S Rothschild coined the term "biosemiotic" in a lecture for the New York Academy of Sciences, a theory that was influenced by the philosophies of Edmund Husserl and Charles Peirce. Rothschild retired from Hadassah University Hospital in 1965 and dedicated his time to lecturing about his findings. In 1981, Rothschild helped to found the World Associated for Dynamic Psychiatry, acting as the Honorary President of the Israeli Branch. 1986 saw the publication of Rothschild’s »Die Evolution als innere Anpassung an Gott«.

Friedrich Rothschild died on March 6, 1995.

== Works ==
- Rothschild, Friedrich S. 1963. Posture and psyche. In: Halpern, Lipman (ed.), Problems of Dynamic Neurology: Studies on the Higher Functions of the Human Nervous System. Jerusalem: Hebrew University, 475–509.
