= Andreas Weber (writer) =

German biologist, biosemiotician, philosopher and journalist

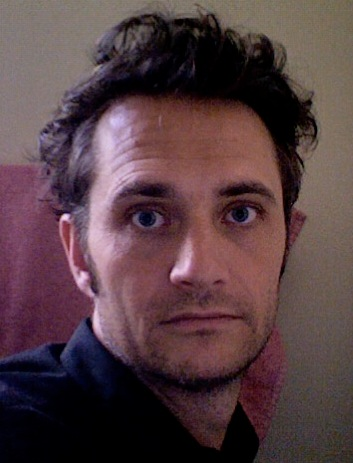
- Weber in 2009
- Born: 4 November 1967 (age 58); Hamburg, West Germany
- Occupations: Biologist; Biosemiotician; Philosopher; Journalist

Andreas Weber (born 4 November 1967) is a German biologist, biosemiotician, philosopher and journalist.

== Biography ==
Andreas Weber studied biology and philosophy in Berlin, Freiburg, Hamburg and Paris. He became a PhD in philosophy in 2003 with the thesis Natur als Bedeutung. Versuch einer semiotischen Theorie des Lebendigen. He has worked as a journalist for publications such as Die Zeit, GEO, Merian and Greenpeace Magazin. He lives in Berlin and Italy with his wife and two children.

In his monographs, such as Alles fühlt. Mensch, Natur und die Revolution der Lebenswissenschaften (2007), Biokapital. Die Versöhnung von Ökonomie, Natur und Menschlichkeit (2008) and Lebendigkeit. Eine erotische Ökologie (2015), he promotes concepts such as sensation, subjectivity and beauty as fundamental for interpreting the world.

== Bibliography ==
- Natur als Bedeutung. Versuch einer semiotischen Theorie des Lebendigen. (PhD thesis), Würzburg 2003, ISBN 3-8260-2471-0.
- Alles fühlt. Mensch, Natur und die Revolution der Lebenswissenschaften. Berlin Verlag, Berlin 2007 ISBN 3-8270-0670-8.
- Biokapital. Die Versöhnung von Ökonomie, Natur und Menschlichkeit. Berlin Verlag, Berlin 2008, ISBN 3-8270-0792-5.
- Mehr Matsch! – Kinder brauchen Natur. Ullstein, Berlin 2011, ISBN 978-3-550-08817-9.
- Minima Animalia. Ein Stundenbuch der Natur. thinkOya, Klein Jasedow 2012, ISBN 978-3-927369-68-9.
- Das Quatsch-Matsch-Buch. Kösel, Munich 2013, ISBN 978-3-466-30983-2.
- Lebendigkeit. Eine erotische Ökologie. Kösel, Munich 2014, ISBN 978-3-466-30988-7.
- Enlivenment. Eine Kultur des Lebens. Versuch einer Poetik für das Anthropozän. Matthes & Seitz, Berlin 2015, ISBN 978-3-95757-160-1.
- Lebendigkeit sei! Für eine Politik des Lebens. Ein Manifest für das Anthropozän. With Hildegard Kurt, thinkOya, Klein Jasedow 2015, ISBN 978-3-927369-95-5.
- Sein und Teilen. Eine Praxis schöpferischer Existenz. Transkript, Bielefeld 2017, ISBN 978-3-8376-3527-0.

English or translated into English

- Enlivenment. Towards a Fundamental Shift in the Concepts of Nature, Culture and Politics. Heinrich-Böll-Stiftung, Berlin 2013, ISBN 978-3-86928-105-6.
- The Biology of Wonder: Aliveness, Feeling and the Metamorphosis of Science. New Society Publishers 2016, ISBN 978-0-86571-799-2.
- Matter and Desire. An Erotic Ecology. Chelsea Green, White River Junction 2017, ISBN 978-1-60358-697-9.
- Enlivenment. Towards a Poetics for the Anthropocene. The MIT Press, Cambridge, MA / London 2019, ISBN 978-0-262-53666-0.
