= Biosemiotics (journal) =

- Discipline: Biosemiotics
- Language: English
- Edited by: Yogi H. Hendlin

Publication details
- History: 2008-present
- Publisher: Springer Science+Business Media
- Frequency: Triannually
- Impact factor: 1.9 (2024)

Standard abbreviations
- ISO 4: Biosemiotics

Indexing
- ISSN: 1875-1342 (print); 1875-1350 (web)
- OCLC no.: 263367598

Links
- Journal homepage; Online archive

Biosemiotics is a triannual peer-reviewed scientific journal on biosemiotics published by Springer Science+Business Media. It was established by Claus Emmeche, Jesper Hoffmeyer, Kalevi Kull, Marcello Barbieri and Anton Markoš in 2008 with 3 issues per year and is an official journal of the International Society for Biosemiotic Studies. The current editor-in-chief is Yogi Hale Hendlin (Erasmus University Rotterdam), with Jana Švorcová (Charles University, Prague) as co-editor-in-chief.

The journal was preceded by the Journal of Biosemiotics, published in 2005.

== Abstracting and indexing ==
The journal is abstracted and indexed in:

- Academic OneFile
- Arts and Humanities Citation Index
- Current Contents/Arts and Humanities
- Current Contents/Social & Behavioral Sciences
- Scopus
- Science Citation Index Expanded
- Social Sciences Citation Index

According to the Journal Citation Reports, the journal has a 2024 impact factor of 1.9.
