= Ecosemiotics =

Branch of semiotics

Ecosemiotics is a branch of semiotics in its intersection with human ecology, ecological anthropology and ecocriticism. It studies sign processes in culture, which relate to other living beings, communities, and landscapes. Ecosemiotics also deals with sign-mediated aspects of ecosystems.

As stressed in ecosemiotic studies, environment has semiotic quality in different ways and levels. Material environment has affordances and potentials to participate in sign relations. Animal species attribute meanings to the environment based on their needs and umwelts. In human culture, environment can become meaningful in literary and artistic representations or through symbolization of animals or landscapes. Cultural representations of the environment in turn influence the natural environment through human actions.

Ecosemiotics analyzes processes, transmissions and problems that occur in and between the different semiotic layers of the environment. The central focus of ecosemiotics concerns the role of concepts (sign-based models people have) in designing and changing the environment. Concepts of ecosemiotic analysis are, for instance, semiocide, affordance, eco-field, consortium, dissent.

The field was initiated by Winfried Nöth and Kalevi Kull, and later elaborated by Almo Farina and Timo Maran. Ecosemiotics includes (or largely overlaps) with semiotics of landscape.

== See also ==
- Biosemiotics
- Ecolinguistics
- Environmental hermeneutics
- Environmental history
- Jakob von Uexküll Centre

== Literature ==
- Nöth, Winfried 1998. Ecosemiotics. Sign Systems Studies 26: 332–343.
- Kull, Kalevi 1998. Semiotic ecology: Different natures in the semiosphere. Sign Systems Studies 26: 344–371.
- Maran, Timo; Kull, Kalevi 2014. Ecosemiotics: main principles and current developments. Geografiska Annaler: Series B, Human Geography 96(1): 41–50.
- Siewers, Alfred Kentigern 2013. Re-Imagining Nature: Environmental Humanities and Ecosemiotics. Bucknell University Press.
