= Kritik (magazine) =

Cultural magazine in Denmark (1967–2016)

- Categories: Cultural magazine
- Frequency: Bi-monthly
- Publisher: Gyldendal
- Founder: Aage Henriksen; Johan Fjord Jensen
- Founded: 1967
- Final issue: 2016
- Country: Denmark
- Based in: Copenhagen
- Language: Danish
- Website: Kritik
- ISSN: 0454-5354

Kritik was a bimonthly cultural magazine with a special reference to literature, which was based in Copenhagen, Denmark. It existed between 1967 and 2016.

== History and profile ==
Kritik was established in 1967. The founders were Aage Henriksen and Johan Fjord Jensen. The magazine mostly featured articles on literary criticism.

Kritik, based in Copenhagen, was published on a bimonthly basis by Gyldendal.

Throughout its existence the editorial stance of Kritik changed. In the 1970s the magazine tried to offer Marxism-oriented approach towards the understanding of literature. In the 1980s it heavily engaged in cultural criticism. During the 1990s its main focus was on art and philosophy. Kritik ended publication in 2016.
