= International Society for Biosemiotic Studies =

Academic society for the researchers in semiotic biology

The International Society for Biosemiotic Studies (ISBS) is an academic society for the researchers in semiotic biology. The Society was established in 2005. Its official journal is Biosemiotics, published by Springer and launched in 2008.

As Thomas Sebeok states, the International Biosemiotics Society (IBS) was founded in Glottertal on June 8, 1990. Although it did not actually begin operating, the Glottertal meetings gave rise to an international biosemiotics group that (re)founded the society in 2005.

The purpose of the ISBS is to constitute an organizational framework for the collaboration among scholars dedicated to biosemiotic studies, including the interdisciplinary research of sign processes in living systems, organic codes, and biocommunication. The ISBS attempts to develop the qualitative research methods in biology. Among the central focuses is also theoretical semiotics as a basis for theoretical biology.

The ISBS assures the organization of regular meetings on research into the semiotics of nature, as well as promotes publication of scholarly work on the semiotics of life processes. The ISBS organizes the annual international conferences (Gatherings in Biosemiotics) that were started by Copenhagen and Tartu biosemioticians and have taken place regularly already since 2001.

The first President of the ISBS was Jesper Hoffmeyer (Copenhagen University), the second President (since 2015) is Kalevi Kull.

== Jesper Hoffmeyer Biosemiotics Award ==
The Society awards best early career presenter at the annual Gatherings in Biosemiotics with a Jesper Hoffmeyer Biosemiotics Award. The award recipients have been Tyler Bennett (2018), Ivan Fomin (2019), Adam Klos and Przemysław Płonka (2020), Joshua Bacigalupi (2021), Rebeca Méndez and Òscar Castro (2022), Oscar Miyamoto (2023), Camilo José Medína Ramirez (2024), Brian Khumalo and Devon Schiller (2025).

== See also ==
- French Zoosemiotics Society
