= August Homburger =

German child psychiatrist

August Homburger (1873–1930) was a prominent German child psychiatrist, hailed as a "pioneer" in the field.

He taught as a professor at Heidelberg University, where he was the founder alongside Ernst Moro of the Children's Counselling Centre. He wrote extensively about the haltlose personality disorder in children.

Leon Eisenburg credited Homburger's 1926 magnum opus "Lectures on the Psychopathology of Childhood" as the first comprehensive source on childhood psychiatry.
