= Thure von Uexküll =

German scholar of psychosomatic medicine and biosemiotics

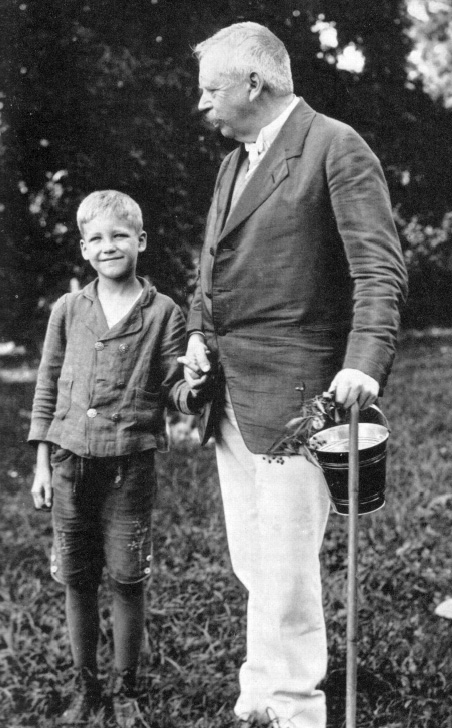
Thure von Uexküll in 1915 with his father

Karl Kuno Thure Freiherr von Uexküll (March 15, 1908, Heidelberg – September 29, 2004, Freiburg) was a German scholar of psychosomatic medicine and biosemiotics. He developed the approach of his father, Jakob von Uexküll, in the study of living systems and applied it in medicine.

His mother was Gudrun Baroness von Uexküll (Gräfin von Schwerin).

== Career ==
1955–1965
Director of the Medical Outpatient Department at the University of Giessen
1966–1977
Director of the Department of Internal Medicine and Psychosomatics at the University of Ulm

== Awards ==
Honorary Doctor of the University of Tartu (1994)

== Works ==
- Der Sinn des Lebens (with Jakob von Uexküll). Godesberg: H.Küpper (1947).
- Der Mensch und die Natur. Grundzüge einer Naturphilosophie. Bern: Francke (1953).
- Grundfragen der psychosomatischen Medizin. Hamburg: Rowohlt (1963).
- Signs, Symbols and Systems. In: T. Sebeok, R. Posner (Hg): A semiotic Landscape. Den Haag, Paris, New York (1974), 487–492.
- Lehrbuch der psychosomatischen Medizin. Urban und Schwarzenberg, München; Wien; Baltimore (1979)
- Die Umweltlehre als Theorie der Zeichenprozesse. In: Th v. Uexküll (Hg): Kompositionslehre der Natur. Biologie als undogmatische Naturwissenschaft; ausgewählte Schriften. Frankfurt, Berlin, Wien: Ullstein (1980)
- Semiotics and medicine. In: Semiotica 38 (1982), 3/4: 205–215.
- Semiotics and the problem of the observer. In: Semiotica 48 (1984), 3/4: 187–195.
- Zeichen und Realität als anthroposemiotisches Problem. In: Oehler, Klaus (Hrsg.): Zeichen und Realität. Tübingen, Stauffenburg-Verlag (1984), 1: 61–72.
- Medicine and Semiotics. In: Semiotica, 61 (1986), 3/4: 201–217.
- Die Wissenschaft von dem Lebendigen. In: Perspektiven der Philosophie. Neues Jahrbuch (1987), 13: 451–461.
- Theorie der Humanmedizin. Grundlagen ärztlichen Denkens und Handelns. (with Wolfgang Wesiack): München: Urban und Schwarzenberg (1988)
- Naturwissenschaft als Zeichenlehre. In: Merkur (1989), 43: 225–234.
- Die Bedeutung der Semiotik für die Medizin. In: P. Rusterholz, M. Svilar (Ed). Welt der Zeichen - Welt der Wirklichkeit, Berner Universitätsschriften, Band 38, Verlag Paul Haupt (1993), 38: 85–100.
- Endosemiosis. (together with Werner Geigges und Jörg Hermann) In: Semiotica, (1993), 96, 1/2, 5–51.
- Biosemiose. In: R.Posner, K. Robering, T. Sebeok (Ed.). Semiotik. Berlin, New York: Walter de Gruyter, (1997), 447–457.
- Endosemiose. In: R. Posner, K. Robering, T. Sebeok (Hg.). Semiotik. Berlin, New York: Walter de Gruyter, (1997), 464–487.
- Psychosomatic Medicine. München: Urban & Schwarzenberg (1997).
- Theorie der Humanmedizin (with Wolfgang Wesiack). München: Urban & Schwarzenberg (1998).
