= Semiotics of agriculture =

The semiotics of agriculture are the observations of the images, namely photographs, surrounding agriculture and the meaning communicated by those images.

== Images as signs of agriculture ==
Images of agriculture were examined in Sara King’s thesis work in conjunction with Dr. Emily Rhodes, titled Impressions of Agriculture: Using Semiotics to Decode Agricultural Images. Jennifer Norwood observed similar patterns in her work: A semiotic analysis of biotechnology and food safety photographs, and used these to discuses images associated with agriculture.

Agricultural images, according to King and Rhodes, when viewed as semiotic signs of agriculture are viewed on a scale. People with high exposure to agriculture (those with agricultural backgrounds such as FFA, family farms, etc.) tend to associate agricultural images with day-to-day tasks, such as operating farm equipment or getting things ready to plan and objects such as muddy boots or farm tools. Those with low exposure to agriculture (those who grew up in suburban or urban areas) tend to associate the images of agriculture with agricultural or open-space landscapes and finished agricultural food products in grocery stores. There are also those with medium exposure to agriculture, who view agricultural images as somewhere in between industrial and open-space settings of agriculture.

In another study, conducted by Leslie Edgar and Tracy Rutherford titled: A Semiotic Analysis of a Texas Cooperative Extension Marketing Packet, agricultural images of this marketing packet revealed five repeating themes that included diversity, relationships, messages portrayed, and stereotypes.

According to a study titled: “The Stuff You Need Out Here”: A Semiotic Case Study Analysis of an Agricultural Company’s Advertisements by Emily B. Rhoades and Tracy Irani, agricultural images used in advertisements and in the media typically follow ideological views held by the American public. These ideologies contain stereotypes of those who live in rural areas and those who are directly involved in agriculture or agricultural production. Many of these stereotypes portray farmers in a negative way.

== Symbolic, iconic, and indexical modes of visual agricultural signs ==
Charles Peirce identified three different types of signs: symbolic, iconic, and indexical modes of signs. Symbolic modes of signs are signs that do not resemble the signified; they are arbitrary or purely conventional. An example of a symbolic signs would be the alphabet. Iconic modes of signs are those in which the signifier is perceived as resembling the signified. Examples of iconic signs include portraits and scale-models. Indexical signs are those in which the signifier is not arbitrary but is directly related to the signified. Examples of indexical signs include thunder and footprints.

Agricultural images in are typically classified in the iconic and indexical modes of Peirce's modes of signs. Images associated with agricultural typically depict open-space landscapes, farm machinery, farm or ranch workers, agricultural food products, farm clothing, corn, cows, and farm tools.

== See also ==
- Semiotics
- Advertising
- Visual communication
