= Semiosis =

Mode of communication

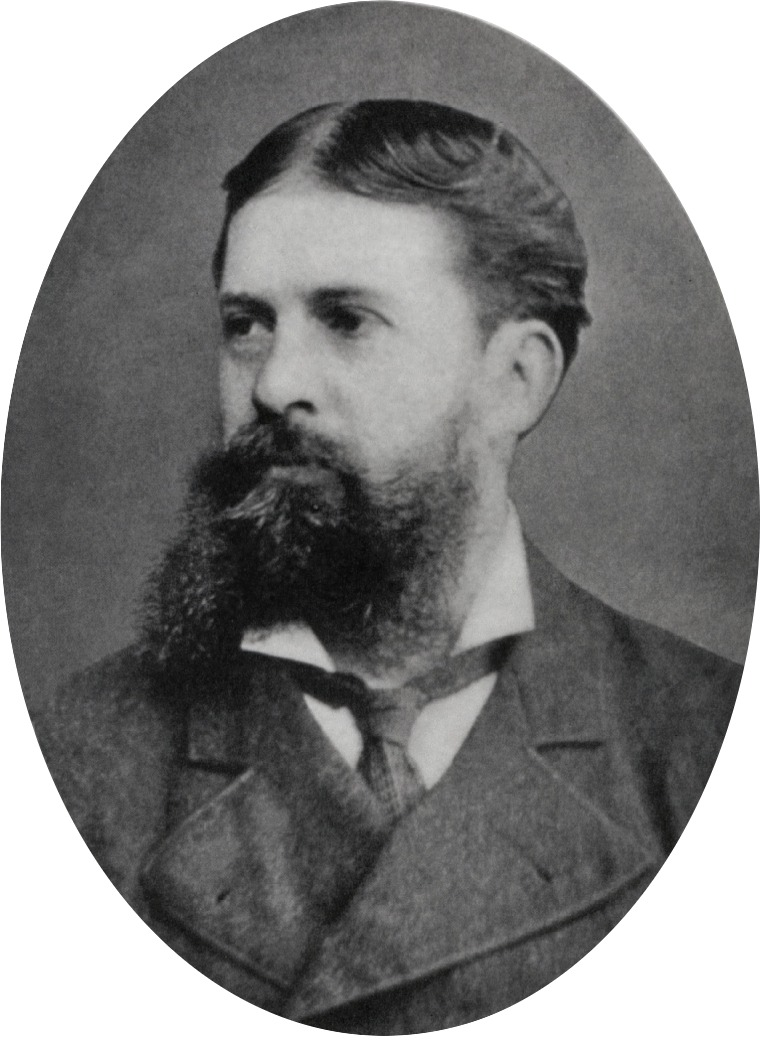
Charles Sanders Peirce, who coined the term

Semiosis (from Ancient Greek σημείωσις (sēmeíōsis), from σημειῶ (sēmeiô) 'to mark'), or sign process, is any form of activity, conduct, or process that involves signs, including the production of meaning. A sign is anything that communicates a meaning, that is not the sign itself, to the interpreter of the sign. The meaning can be intentional such as a word uttered with a specific meaning, or unintentional, such as a symptom being a sign of a particular medical condition. Signs can communicate through any of the senses, visual, auditory, tactile, olfactory, or taste.

The term was introduced by Charles Sanders Peirce (1839–1914) to describe a process that interprets signs as referring to their objects, as described in his theory of sign relations, or semiotics. Other theories of sign processes are sometimes carried out under the heading of semiology, following on the work of Ferdinand de Saussure (1857–1913).

== Overview ==
Peirce was interested primarily in logic, while Saussure was interested primarily in linguistics, which examines the functions and structures of language. However, both of them recognized that there is more to significant representation than language in the narrow sense of speech and writing alone. With this in mind, they developed the idea of semiosis to relate language to other sign systems both human and nonhuman. Today, there is disagreement as to the operating cause and effect. One school of thought argues that language is the semiotic prototype and its study illuminates principles that can be applied to other sign systems. The opposing school argues that there is a metasign system and that language is simply one of many codes for communicating meaning, citing the way in which human infants learn about their environment before they have acquired verbal language. Whichever may be right, a preliminary definition of semiosis is any action or influence for communicating meaning by establishing relationships between signs which are to be interpreted by an audience.

== Discussion ==
Semiosis is the performance element involving signs. Although a human can communicate many things unintentionally, individuals usually speak or write to elicit some kind of response. Yet there is little real explanation of how semiosis produces its effects, which is odd given that the word "sign" is in everyday use and most people would understand what it means. But semiotics has not offered clear technical definitions, nor is there agreement about how signs should be classified.

As an insect (or any animal, human or otherwise) moves through its environment (sometimes termed the umwelt), all the senses collect data that are made available to the brain. However, to prevent sensory overload, only salient data will receive the full attention of the cognitive elements of the mind. This indicates that a part of the process must be controlled by a model of the real world capable of ranking data elements in terms of their significance and filtering out the data irrelevant to survival. A sign cannot function until the brain or audience distinguishes it from the background noise. When this happens, the sign then triggers cognitive activity to interpret the data input and so convert it into meaningful information. This would suggest that, in the semiosphere, the process of semiosis goes through the following cycle:

- The plant, insect, or animal with the need to communicate (e.g., to recognise an object of food) will know what needs to be said and assess the best means of saying it (e.g., starting a searching behaviour);
- This information will then be encoded and relevant muscle groups will effect transmission — although to some extent intentional in the human, the actual movements of the body are autonomic, i.e. the individual is not aware of moving individual muscles, but achieves the desired result by an act of will (see H. L. A. Hart on the nature of an action);
- The audience filters ambient data and perceives the uttered code as a grouping of signs;
- The audience then interprets the signs (sometimes termed decoding) to attribute meaning. This involves matching the signs received against existing patterns and their meanings held in memory (i.e. it is learned and understood within the community). In plants, insects and animals, the results of a successful interpretation will be an observable response to the stimuli perceived.

In biology, scout bees and ants will return home to tell the others where food is to be found, the fact of fertility must be announced to prospective mates from the same species, and the presence of danger must be passed as a warning to others in the group. Such transmission may be chemical, auditory, visual, or tactile whether singly or in combination. There is a new field of research activity termed biosemiotics, and Jesper Hoffmeyer claims that endosymbiosis, self-reference, code duality, the availability of receptors, autopoiesis, and others are the general properties of all living systems. Thomas Sebeok suggests that a similar list of properties for life may coincide with the definition of semiosis, i.e. that the test of whether something is alive, is a test to determine whether and how it communicates meaning to another of its kind, i.e., whether it has semiosis. This has been called the Sebeok's Thesis.

For humans, semiosis is an aspect of the wider systems of social interaction in which information is exchanged. It can result in particular types of social encounter, but the process itself can be constrained by social conventions such as propriety, privacy, and disclosure. This means that no social encounter is reducible to semiosis alone, and that semiosis can only be understood by identifying and exploring all the conditions that make the transmission and reception of signs possible and effective. When two individuals meet, the ways in which they think, the specific identities they assume, the emotional responses they make, and the beliefs, motives, and purposes they have, will frame the situation as it develops dynamically and potentially test the legitimacy of the outcomes. All these elements are, to a greater or lesser extent, semiotic in nature in that prevailing codes and values are being applied. Consequently, where the line is drawn between semiosis and semiotics will always be somewhat arbitrary.

== See also ==
- Biosemiotics
- Index of semiotic terms
- Neurosemiotics
