= Zoosemiotics =

Study of the use of signs among animals

Zoosemiotics is the semiotic study of the use of signs among animals, more precisely the study of semiosis among animals, i.e. the study of how something comes to function as a sign to some animal. It is the study of animal forms of knowing.

Considered part of biosemiotics, zoosemiotics is related to the fields of ethology and animal communication. It was developed by semiotician Thomas Sebeok based on the theories of German-Estonian biologist Jakob von Uexküll. The field is defined by having as its subject matter all of those semiotic processes that are shared by both animals and humans. The field also differs from the field of animal communication in that it also interprets signs that are not communicative in the traditional sense, such as camouflage, mimicry, courtship behavior etc. The field also studies cross-species communication, for example between humans and animals.

== Contemporary developments ==
Since the 2020s, zoosemiotics has increasingly engaged with developments in artificial intelligence and machine learning, particularly in relation to projects aimed at analysing and interpreting animal communication. This research has examined the extent to which computational systems can contribute to the study of animal semiosis while also highlighting the epistemological and semiotic limits of algorithmic approaches.

Recent contributions have argued that animal communication cannot be understood solely through the statistical processing of signals, but requires consideration of the organism's Umwelt, ecological context, and embodied forms of meaning-making. In this framework, artificial intelligence is viewed not as a direct translator of animal languages but as a technosemiotic mediator involved in the production of new interpretive relations between humans and non-human animals.

These developments have led to the proposal of concepts such as generative zoosemiotics, which investigates the role of artificial intelligence in shaping interspecies communication, and semiotic opacity, which emphasizes the irreducibility of animal sign processes to fully transparent translation.

== See also ==
- Biosemiotics
- French Zoosemiotics Society
- Phytosemiotics
- Neurosemiotics
- Signalling theory
