= Umwelt =

The world as it appears through a species's perceptual systems

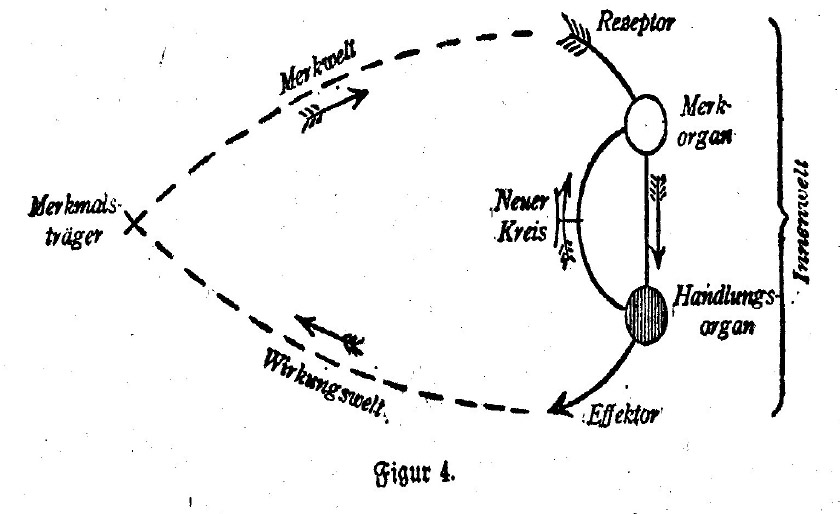
"Early Scheme for a circular Feedback Circle" from Theoretische Biologie 1920

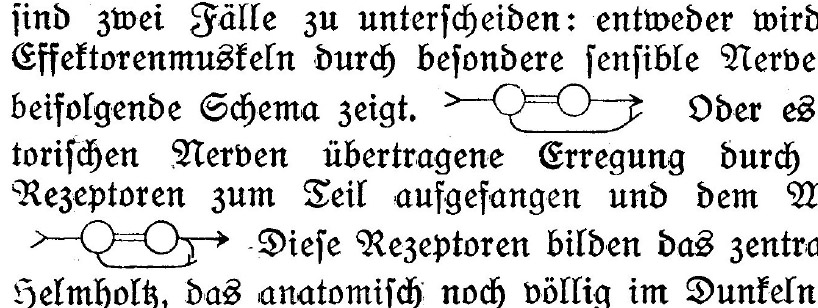
Small circular Feedback Pictograms between the Text

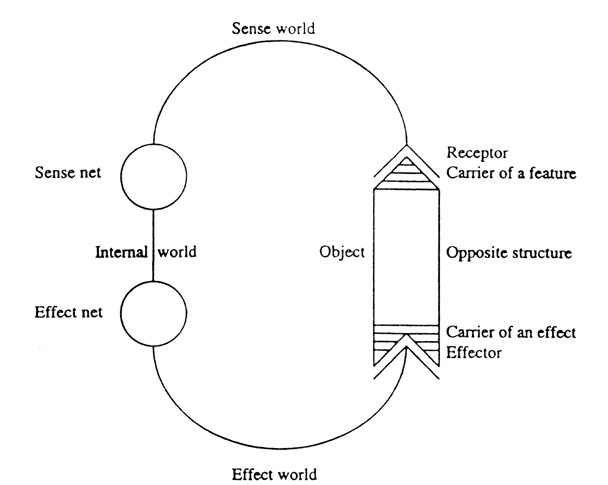
Schematic view of a cycle as an early biocyberneticist

In semiotics, an umwelt (plural: umwelten; from German Umwelt 'environment, surroundings') is the specific way in which organisms of a particular species perceive and experience the world, shaped by the capabilities of their sensory organs and perceptual systems.

In the semiotic theories of Jakob von Uexküll and Thomas Sebeok, it is considered to be the "biological foundations that lie at the very center of the study of both communication and signification in the human [and non-human] animal". Often translated as "self-centered world," the term highlights how organisms, despite sharing the same physical environment, can inhabit distinct perceptual realities.

Uexküll proposed that each species has its own umwelt, a notion complemented by related concepts like Umgebung (the environment or Umwelt as observed externally) and Innenwelt (the internal mapping of the self to the external world). These ideas hold particular significance for fields such as cognitive philosophy, robotics, and cybernetics, offering insights into resolving complex problems like the infinite regress of the Cartesian Theater—the flawed notion of an endless chain of internal observers watching consciousness, which Umwelt reframes as a unified biological process.

== Discussion ==
Each functional component of an umwelt has a meaning that represents the organism's model of the world. These functional components correspond approximately to perceptual features, as described by Anne Treisman. It is also the semiotic world of the organism, including all the meaningful aspects of the world for any particular organism. It can be water, food, shelter, potential threats or points of reference for navigation. An organism creates and reshapes its own umwelt when it interacts with the world. This is termed a 'functional circle'. The umwelt theory states that the mind and the world are inseparable because it is the mind that interprets the world for the organism. Because of the individuality and uniqueness of the history of every single organism, the umwelten of different organisms differ. When two umwelten interact, this creates a semiosphere.

As a term, umwelt also unites all the semiotic processes of an organism into a whole. Internally, an organism is the sum of its parts operating in functional circles and, to survive, all the parts must work cooperatively. This is termed the "collective umwelt" which models the organism as a centralised system from the cellular level upward. This requires the semiosis of any one part to be continuously connected to any other semiosis operating within the same organism. If anything disrupts this process, the organism will not operate efficiently.

Uexküll's writings show a specific interest in the various worlds that he believed to exist ('conceptually') from the point of view of the umwelt of different creatures such as ticks, sea urchins, amoebae, jellyfish, and sea worms.

The biosemiotic turn in Jakob von Uexküll's analysis occurs in his discussion of the animal's relationship with its environment. The umwelt is for him an environment-world which is, according to Agamben, "constituted by a more or less broad series of elements [called] 'carriers of significance' or 'marks' which are the only things that interest the animal". Agamben goes on to paraphrase Uexküll's example of the tick, saying:

"...this eyeless animal finds the way to her watchpoint [at the top of a tall blade of grass] with the help of only its skin’s general sensitivity to light. The approach of her prey becomes apparent to this blind and deaf bandit only through her sense of smell. The odor of butyric acid, which emanates from the sebaceous follicles of all mammals, works on the tick as a signal that causes her to abandon her post (on top of the blade of grass/bush) and fall blindly downward toward her prey. If she is fortunate enough to fall on something warm (which she perceives by means of an organ sensible to a precise temperature) then she has attained her prey, the warm-blooded animal, and thereafter needs only the help of her sense of touch to find the least hairy spot possible and embed herself up to her head in the cutaneous tissue of her prey. She can now slowly suck up a stream of warm blood."

Thus, for the tick, the umwelt is reduced to only three (biosemiotic) carriers of significance: (1) the odor of butyric acid, which emanates from the sebaceous follicles of all mammals; (2) the temperature of 37°C (corresponding to the blood of all mammals); and (3) the hairy topography of mammals.

== Critics ==
Uexküll's application of the notion of "umwelt" to the human person has been contested. In "Welt und Umwelt" and "Die Wahrheit der Dinge", the philosopher and sociologist Josef Pieper argued that reason allows the human person to live in "Welt" (world) while plants and animals do indeed live in an Umwelt –a notion he traces back to Plato, Aristotle, and Thomas Aquinas.

== See also ==
- Cognized environment – Anthropological concept
- Existential therapy – Form of psychotherapy
- Phenomenology – Philosophical method and schools of philosophy
- Qualia – Instances of subjective experience
- Reality tunnel – Theory of personal perception
- "What Is It Like to Be a Bat?" – 1974 philosophy paper by Thomas Nagel
- Worldview, also known as Weltanschauung – Fundamental cognitive orientation of an individual or society
- Zoosemiotics – Study of the use of signs among animals
