= Claus Emmeche =

Danish theoretical biologist and philosopher

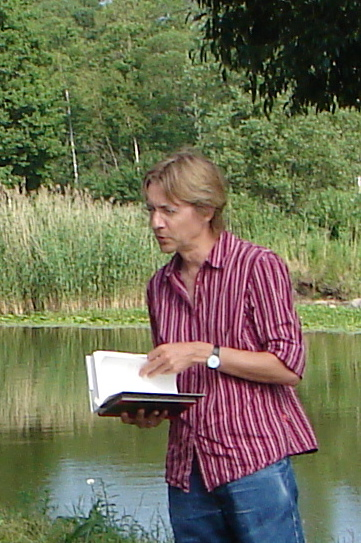
Claus Emmeche in Estonia, 2006.

Claus Emmeche (born 1956) is a Danish theoretical biologist and philosopher, one of founders of contemporary biosemiotics. He is associate professor at the University of Copenhagen, and is head of the Center for the Philosophy of Nature and Science Studies at the Faculty of Science (CPNSS, hosted by the Niels Bohr Institute).

His research interests are in philosophy of science, especially philosophy of biology, theoretical biology (especially morphogenesis and evolution, developmental systems, complex systems), artificial life, biosemiotics, and other areas within philosophy. He has made pioneering studies in the field of semiotics of friendship.

== Activism ==
Claus Emmeche was one of the organizers of a petition directed at Helge Sander's education reforms, which the petition claimed undermined academic freedom by granting a broad majority of the management of universities to people from outside the academic community. As of August, 2008, 35% of Danish academics had signed the petition. By November, this had risen to about 50%.

== Notable works ==
Claus Emmeche has authored or co-authored at least 31 works in science and philosophy in English. Some of his most notable English works include:

- The Garden in the Machine: The Emerging Science of Artificial Life, Princeton University Press, (ISBN 0691029032)
- Downward Causation: Minds, Bodies and Matter by Peter Bogh Andersen, Claus Emmeche, Niels Ole Finnemann, and Peder Voetmann Christiansen. Princeton University Press, (ISBN 0691029032) (1996)
- Emmeche, Claus; Kull, Kalevi; Stjernfelt, Frederik 2002. Reading Hoffmeyer, Rethinking Biology. [Tartu Semiotics Library 3.] Tartu: Tartu University Press.
- Charbel Niño El-Hani, João Queiroz, Claus Emmeche 2009. Genes, information, and semiosis. [Tartu Semiotics Library 8.] Tartu: Tartu University Press.
- Towards a Semiotic Biology: Life is the Action of Signs, ed. by Claus Emmeche, and Kalevi Kull. London: Imperial College Press. (2011) See

In Danish, Emmeche has authored or co-authored at least 5 books, 25 articles, and over 47 other works.
