= Jakob Johann von Uexküll =

Baltic German biologist, zoologist, and philosopher (1864–1944)

Jakob von Uexküll
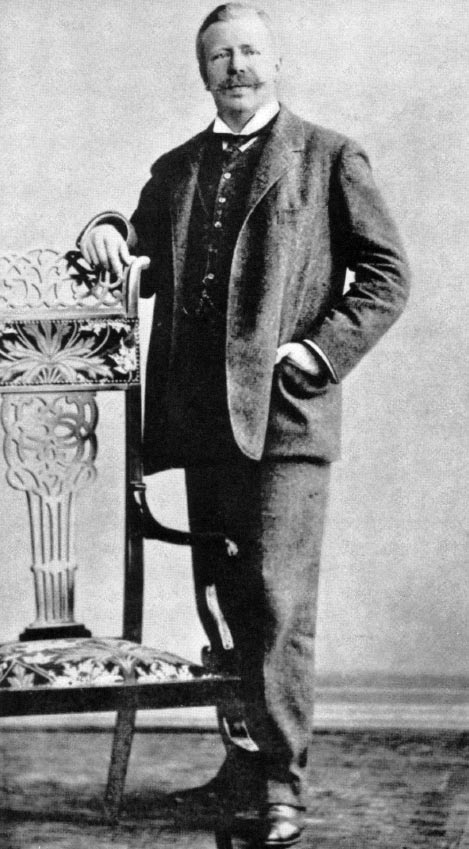
- Jakob Johann von Uexküll in 1903
- Born: Jakob Johann Freiherr von Uexküll; 8 September [O.S. 27 August] 1864; Keblas Manor, Sankt Michaelis, Wiek County, Governorate of Estonia, Russian Empire (in present-day Mihkli, Pärnu County, Estonia)
- Died: 25 July 1944 (aged 79); Capri, Kingdom of Italy
- Education: Imperial University of Dorpat
- Known for: The Umgebung–Umwelt distinction Lebensphilosophie; Biosemiotics
- Father: Alexander von Uexküll
- Scientific career
- Fields: Biology; Semiotics
- Workplaces: University of Hamburg

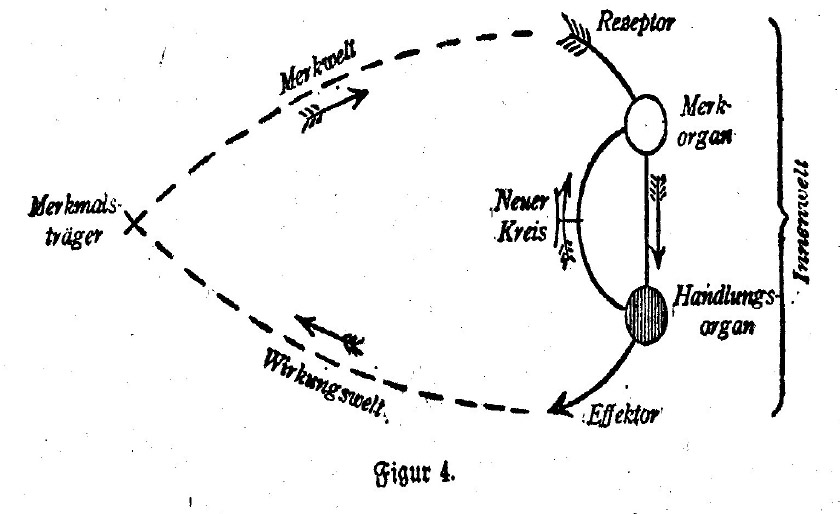
"Early Scheme for a circular Feedback Circle" from Theoretische Biologie 1920

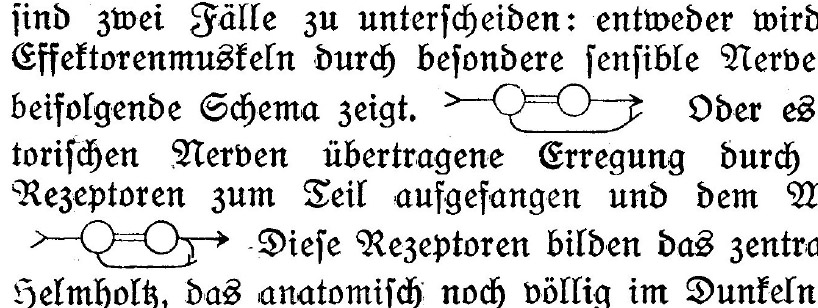
Small circular Feedback Pictograms between the Text

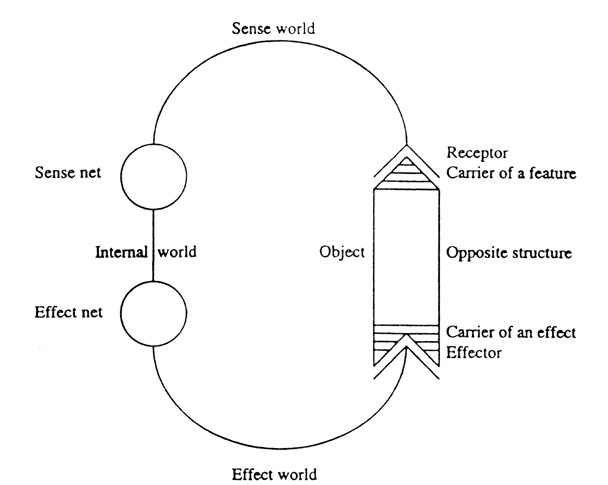
Schematic view of a cycle as an early biocyberneticist

Jakob Johann Freiherr von Uexküll (/ˈʊkskʊl/; German: [ˈʏkskʏl]; 8 September [O.S. 27 August] 1864 – 25 July 1944) was a Baltic German biologist who worked in the fields of muscular physiology and animal behaviour studies and was an influence on the cybernetics of life. However, his most notable contribution is the notion of Umwelt, used by semiotician Thomas Sebeok and philosopher Martin Heidegger. His works established biosemiotics as a field of research.

== Early life ==
The son of Baron Alexander von Uexküll and Sophie von Hahn, Jakob von Uexküll was born in the Keblas estate, Sankt Michaelis, Governorate of Estonia. His aristocratic family lost most of their fortune by expropriation during the Russian Revolution. Needing to support himself, Uexküll in 1924 took a job as professor at the University of Hamburg where he founded the Institut für Umweltforschung.

== Umwelt ==
Uexküll was particularly interested in how living beings perceive their environment(s). He argued that organisms experience life in terms of species-specific, spatio-temporal, "self-in-world" subjective reference frames that he called Umwelt (translated as surrounding-world, phenomenal world, self-world, environment - lit. German environment). These Umwelten (plural of Umwelt) are distinctive from what Uexküll termed the "Umgebung" which would be the living being's surroundings as seen from the likewise peculiar perspective or Umwelt of the human observer. Umwelt may thus be defined as the perceptual world in which an organism exists and acts as a subject. By studying how the senses of various organisms like ticks, sea urchins, amoebae, jellyfish and sea worms work, he was able to build theories of how they experience the world. Because all organisms perceive and react to sensory data as signs, Uexküll argued that they were to be considered as living subjects. This argument was the basis for his biological theory in which the characteristics of biological existence ("life") could not simply be described as a sum of its non-organic parts, but had to be described as subject and a part of a sign system.

The biosemiotic turn in Jakob von Uexküll's analysis occurs in his discussion of the animal's relationship with its environment. The Umwelt is for him an environment-world which is (according to Giorgio Agamben), "constituted by a more or less broad series of elements [called] "carriers of significance" or "marks" which are the only things that interest the animal". Agamben goes on to paraphrase one example from Uexküll's discussion of a tick, saying,

"...this eyeless animal finds the way to her watchpoint [at the top of a tall blade of grass] with the help of only its skin's general sensitivity to light. The approach of her prey becomes apparent to this blind and deaf bandit only through her sense of smell. The odor of butyric acid, which emanates from the sebaceous follicles of all mammals, works on the tick as a signal that causes her to abandon her post (on top of the blade of grass/bush) and fall blindly downward toward her prey. If she is fortunate enough to fall on something warm (which she perceives by means of an organ sensible to a precise temperature) then she has attained her prey, the warm-blooded animal, and thereafter needs only the help of her sense of touch to find the least hairy spot possible and embed herself up to her head in the cutaneous tissue of her prey. She can now slowly suck up a stream of warm blood."

Thus, for the tick, the Umwelt is reduced to only three (biosemiotic) carriers of significance: (1) The odor of butyric acid, which emanates from the sebaceous follicles of all mammals, (2) The temperature of 37 degrees Celsius (corresponding to the blood of all mammals), (3) The hairiness of mammals.

== Theoretical biology ==
Uexküll anticipated many computer science ideas, particularly in the field of robotics, roughly 25 years before these things were invented.

Uexküll views organisms in terms of information processing. He argues every organism has an outer boundary which defines an Umwelt (German word generally meaning "environment", "surrounding world"). Rather than the general meaning, Uexküll's concept draws on the literal meaning of the German word, which is "surround-world", to define the Umwelt as the subjectively perceived surroundings about which information is available to an organism through its senses. This is a subjective Weltanschauung, or "world view", and is therefore fundamentally different from the black box concept, which is derived from the objective Newtonian viewpoint.

The organism has sensors that report the state of the Umwelt and effectors that can change parts of the Umwelt. He distinguished the effector as the logical opposite of the sensor, or sense organ. Sensors and effectors are linked in a feedback loop. Sensor input is processed by a Merkorgan and effectors are controlled by a Werkorgan. The modern term "sensorimotor" used in enactive theories of cognition encompasses these concepts.

He further distinguishes the Umgebung (that part of the Umwelt that represents distal features of the external world, in German "that which is being given as surroundings") from the Innenwelt which is reported directly by sensors and is therefore the only unmediated reality immediately knowable to the organism. The relationship between the distal (mediated, transformed) features of the Umgebung and the proximal (untransformed, unmediated, primal) features of the Innenwelt must be learned by the organism in infancy. The nature of the Umgebung::Innenwelt relationship is relevant to the later theories of embodied cognition.

This is also similar to Kant's phenomenon and noumenon but derived logically from the properties of the sensors. What we now call a "feedback loop" he calls a "function-circle" and "circle" seems to be something like "system". He uses the term "melody" to mean something close to "algorithm". He coins around 75 technical terms, and a proper understanding of his book would require clearly defining them in modern terms and understanding their relations. He notices qualia, comes close to object-oriented programming (page 98) uses the image of a helmsman which later showed up as "cybernetics" (page 291) and makes a good guess about DNA (page 127). He has a large number of ideas, although not expressed clearly in modern terms. His metaphysics is hyper-Kantian ("All reality is subjective appearance", page xv.) Space is a set of direction symbols. He rejects Darwin and says nothing of God. Organisms are based on something called "Plan", the origin of which we cannot know.

Uexküll was an advocate of non-Darwinian evolution and critic of Darwinism. Kalevi Kull noted that "despite his opposition to Darwinism, Uexküll was not anti-evolutionist".

== Influence ==
Works by scholars such as Kalevi Kull connect Uexküll's studies with some areas of philosophy such as phenomenology and hermeneutics. Jakob von Uexküll's theory of biosemiotics directly influenced N. Katherine Hayles' concept of cybersemiotics.

However, despite his influence on the work of philosophers Max Scheler, Ernst Cassirer, Martin Heidegger, Maurice Merleau-Ponty, Peter Wessel Zapffe, Humberto Maturana, Georges Canguilhem, Michel Foucault, Gilles Deleuze, Félix Guattari (in their A Thousand Plateaus, for example) and José Ortega y Gasset he is still not widely known, and his books are mostly out of print in German and in English. A paperback French translation of Streifzüge durch die Umwelten von Tieren und Menschen [A stroll through the Umwelten of animals and humans] of 1934 is currently in print. This book has been translated in English as A Foray into the Worlds of Animals and Humans, with A Theory of Meaning by Jakob von Uexküll, translated by Joseph D. O'Neil, introduction by Dorion Sagan, University of Minnesota Press, 2011. The other available book is "Theoretical Biology", a reprint of the 1926 translation of "Theoretische Biologie" (1920). "Foray" is a popular introduction while "Theoretical Biology" is intended for an academic audience.

== Family ==
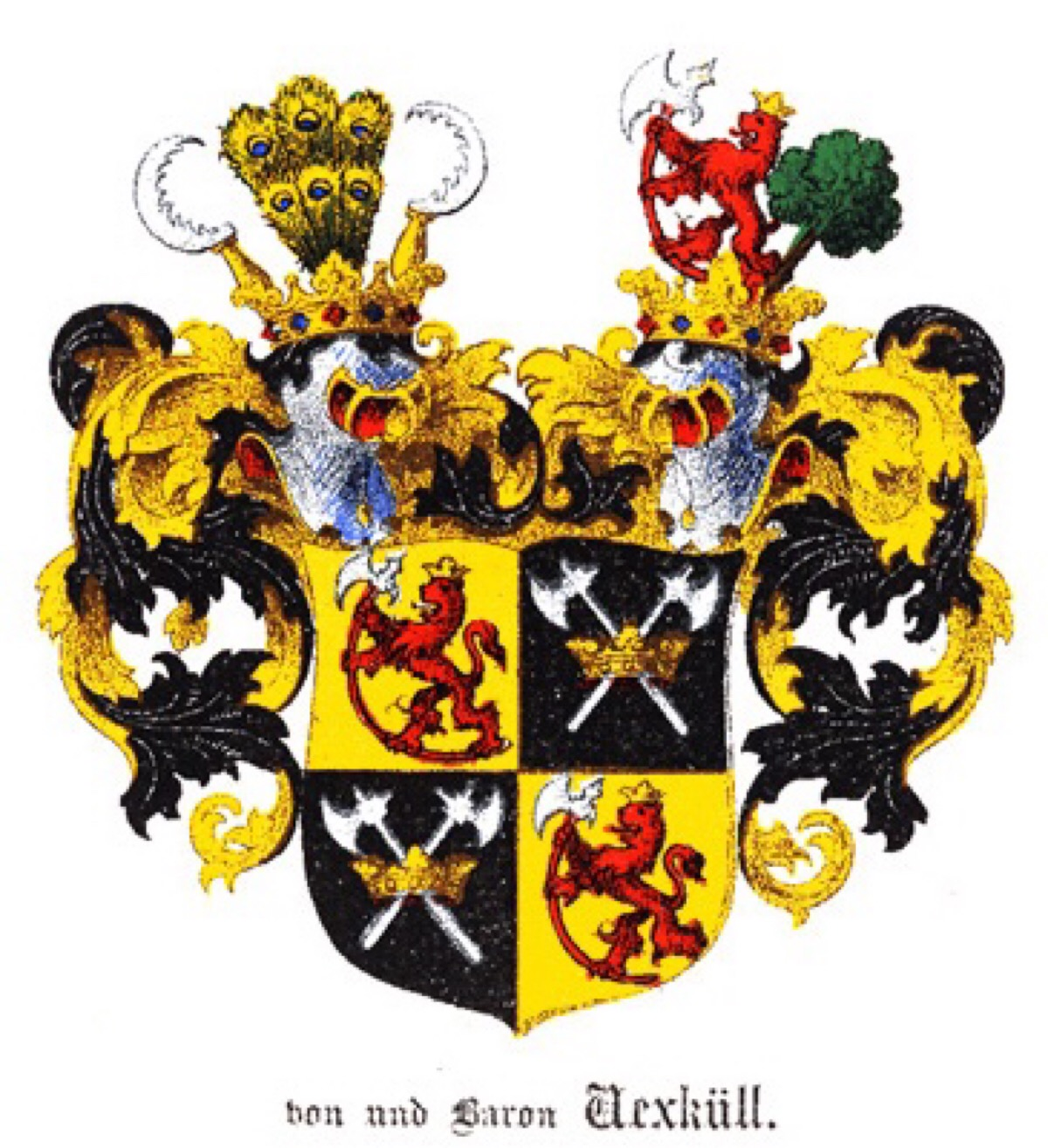
Coat of arms of the Uradel Uexküll family, in the Baltic Coat of arms book by Carl Arvid von Klingspor in 1882

His sons were the physician Thure von Uexküll and journalist Gösta von Uexküll. His daughter was Sophie Luise Damajanti von Uexküll ('Dana'). His grandson is the writer Jakob von Uexküll.

== The Debate on Uexküll's Involvement with National Socialism ==
In 2021 Gottfried Schnödl and Florian Sprenger proved that Uexküll was much more deeply involved in National Socialism than previously known. In 1933 he signed the Confession of German Professors to Adolf Hitler. In May 1934, together with Martin Heidegger, Carl Schmitt, and Alfred Rosenberg, among others, he was a founding member of the Committee for Philosophy of Law of the Academy for German Law, both of which were headed by Hans Frank. This committee was to accompany the National Socialist program with a philosophy of law appropriate to "Germanness." In doing so, Uexküll did not merely seek a connection to National Socialism, but actively participated in the collaborative elaboration of a National Socialist philosophy of law and attempted to substantiate it through his conception of Umwelt. Uexküll's doctrine led to a holistically based rejection of democracy and discharged itself in an identitarian logic in which everything is in its place according to plan and that which is in the wrong place should disappear.

As late as 1933 Uexküll held hopes that the rise of Hitler to power might bring an end to the expansion of communism and the democratization of German society, for which he had an aristocratic antipathy, but his expectations were met with disappointment. In May of the same year Uexküll wrote a letter to Eva Wagner Chamberlain, daughter of Richard Wagner, and wife of his late friend Houston Stewart Chamberlain, lamenting that the ideas of her husband were being used by Nazism to justify the persecution of Jews in Germany, and describing racial discrimination against Jews as "the worst kind of barbarism". By the autumn of 1933, Uexküll evinced disapproval of Nazi policy and ideology, and afterwards tried to avoid political issues, although it sometimes proved impossible. In 1934, Uexküll dedicated his book A Foray into the Worlds of Animals and Humans to a Jewish fellow researcher Otto Cohnheim, who, in his words, "lost his appointment as a university professor because of racial politics".

Following the publication of Sprenger and Schnödl's book, there have been discussions about Uexkülls role in the early 1930s. As Sprenger and Schnödl show, there are no reliable historical sources for many of the assumptions that have been used to defend Uexküll. These anecdotes are taken from a biography of Uexküll written by his wife, Gudrun von Uexküll, in 1964. This book defends Uexküll against all accusations, but does not give any reliable sources or references. For example, Carlo Brentari refers to Uexkülls autobiographical book of personal reminiscences, Nie geschaute Welten (Worlds never seen). Brentari argues that in this book, Uexküll wrote favorably of the Russian Jews and the Baroness Rothschild. He even states that the book officially banned from display in bookshop windows. This assumption has turned out wrong: The book is not listed on any of the National Socialist's lists of banned books. And, contrary to Brentari, Uexküll takes up the idea of the Jews as "parasitic plants" which only grow where they belong. As Sprenger writes: "This rhetoric already holds the germ of the idea that the host must rid itself of this parasite, despite all sympathies he may harbor for individual members of the alien race, and thus end the supposed abuse of his hospitality. It is precisely because the Jewish population is understood as a parasite that it can, in Uexküll's representation, be so easily expelled: transplanted elsewhere, it will be able to live just as well; but there, too, it may also spread parasitically."

However, the thesis of a direct continuity between Uexküll's biological theory and National Socialist biopolitics has been contested on the grounds that his political writings do not constitute a coherent or systematic ideological program. ather than representing a premeditated theoretical design, texts such as Staatsbiologie are characterized as fragmentary, inconsistent, and largely occasional. Uexküll's political polemics constantly shifted over the years in response to changing historical contingencies and biographical circumstances. For example, in his 1915 essay Volk und Staat, Uexküll adopted a fiercely anti-statist position, defining the state as a cold, artificial construct and a "parasite of the people," while idealizing an organic, family-based society. By 1920, in the first edition of Staatsbiologie, his perspective fundamentally changed: he described the state as a true organism and a "living being," directing his polemics against trade unions and characterizing England as a "world parasite". Yet, in the 1928 edition of Theoretische Biologie, he reversed course again, explicitly denying that the human state is an independent organism and attacking "state fanatics" who sought to bind individuals to a state machine at the expense of their personality. In the 1933 revision of Staatsbiologie, his targets shifted once more: he deleted his previous anti-English rhetoric, criticized the "technical disease" of industrial efficiency, and expressed ambiguity regarding the necessity of absolute racial purity, while simultaneously adding a nod to Adolf Hitler and an appeal to Christian neighborly love regardless of class or race. In light of these constant contradictions and reversals, it has therefore been suggested, contrary to Sprenger and Schnödl's reconstruction, that Uexküll's political engagement was primarily occasional and pamphleteering, rather than a premeditated design or a truly coherent continuation of his biological theory. Furthermore, regarding his later participation in the Academy for German Law, it has been suggested that this involvement was primarily motivated by the pragmatic need to secure funding to prevent the closure of his research institute in Hamburg, especially given that his explicitly political publications virtually ceased after 1934. Far from being universally accepted, already in 2022, Feiten suggested that Schnödl and Sprenger's main claim "that Uexküll’s thought as a whole is an irredeemably totalitarian and that no part of it can be separated from the whole and made use of in a different system of ideas without importing also Uexküll’s reactionary political organicism is neither fully convincing as an interpretation of Uexküll as a thinker, nor does it seem to be borne out by the reality of existing appropriations of the concept of Umwelt in the life sciences."

== In popular culture ==
Uexküll's ideas about how organisms create their own concept of time are described in Peter Høeg's novel Borderliners, and contrasted with Isaac Newton's view of time as something that exists independent of life.

Uexküll's Umwelt idea is described and used as a basic concept in Alexandra Horowitz's 2009 book Inside of a Dog and subsequently in Ed Yong's book An Immense World: How Animal Senses Reveal the Hidden Realms Around Us (2022).

== See also ==
- List of Baltic German scientists
- Jakob von Uexküll Centre
- Copenhagen–Tartu school
