= Frederik Stjernfelt =

Danish professor

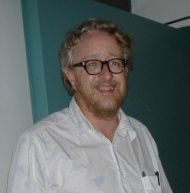
- Born: July 6, 1957 (age 68); Aalborg
- Citizenship: Denmark
- Occupation: professor at Aalborg University in Copenhagen
- Organization: Aalborg University

Frederik Stjernfelt (born July 6, 1957) is a Danish professor and writer. As a professor, he lectures in science studies, history of ideas, and semiotics, at Aalborg University's Copenhagen department.

== Career ==
Stjernfelt has been working as a reviewer and writer at 'Weekendavisen' since 1994. Earlier in his career, he was employed as an editor at Gyldendal's cultural journal 'Kritik' between 1993 and 2012. Stjernfelt has been a member of 'Danish Academy' since 2001. Also, he is cofounder of the political network 'Fri debat', which functions to promote freedom of speech. Subsequently, he has published a number of academic as well as popular books and articles.

== Achievements ==
Stjernfelt has received a number of recognitions and prizes for his work. This includes 'Lærebogsprisen' for his book 'Tal en tanke' in 2006, the Danish Association of Masters and PhDs' research award in 2010, and Blixprisen's 'This year's effort for freedom of speech' in 2017.

Besides his awards, Stjernfelt received funding from the Carlsberg Foundation to write a book on the Danish historic time period of total freedom of the press between 1770 and 1773.

== Private life ==
Frederik Stjernfelt is married to the Danish translator, Agnete Dorph Stjernfelt. He is the father of the Danish artists, Agnes Stjernfelt and Karoline Stjernfelt.
