= Semiotica =

Academic journal on semiotics

- Discipline: Semiotics
- Language: English, French

Publication details
- History: 1969-present
- Publisher: de Gruyter Mouton (Germany)
- Frequency: 5/year

Standard abbreviations
- ISO 4: Semiotica

Indexing
- ISSN: 0037-1998

Links
- Journal homepage

Semiotica is an academic journal covering semiotics. First published in 1969, it is the official journal of the International Association for Semiotic Studies.

== Publication ==
Since 2016, the journal publishes six issues per year. It is published in English and French.

== Editors-in-chief ==
The first editor-in-chief of Semiotica was Thomas Sebeok, who continued this job until his death in 2001. He was succeeded by Jean Umiker-Sebeok (2002–2004), Marcel Danesi (2004–2020), and co-editors-in-chief Stéphanie Walsh Matthews, Massimo Leone, and Jamin Pelkey (since 2021).

== See also ==
- Sign Systems Studies
