= Thomas Sebeok =

Hungarian-American polymath (1920–2001)

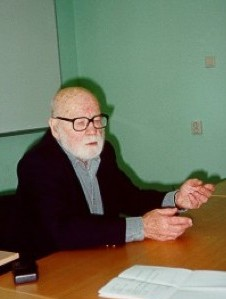
- Sebeok giving a lecture in Tartu
- Born: Sebők Tamás; November 9, 1920; Budapest, Kingdom of Hungary
- Died: December 21, 2001 (aged 81); Bloomington, Indiana, U.S.

Academic background
- Education: University of Cambridge (attended); University of Chicago (B.A.); Princeton University (M.A., Ph.D.)
- Thesis: Finnish and Hungarian case systems: their form and function (1945)
- Doctoral advisor: Roman Jakobson

Academic work
- Institutions: Indiana University
- Main interests: Semiotics (biosemiotics, zoosemiotics); Linguistics

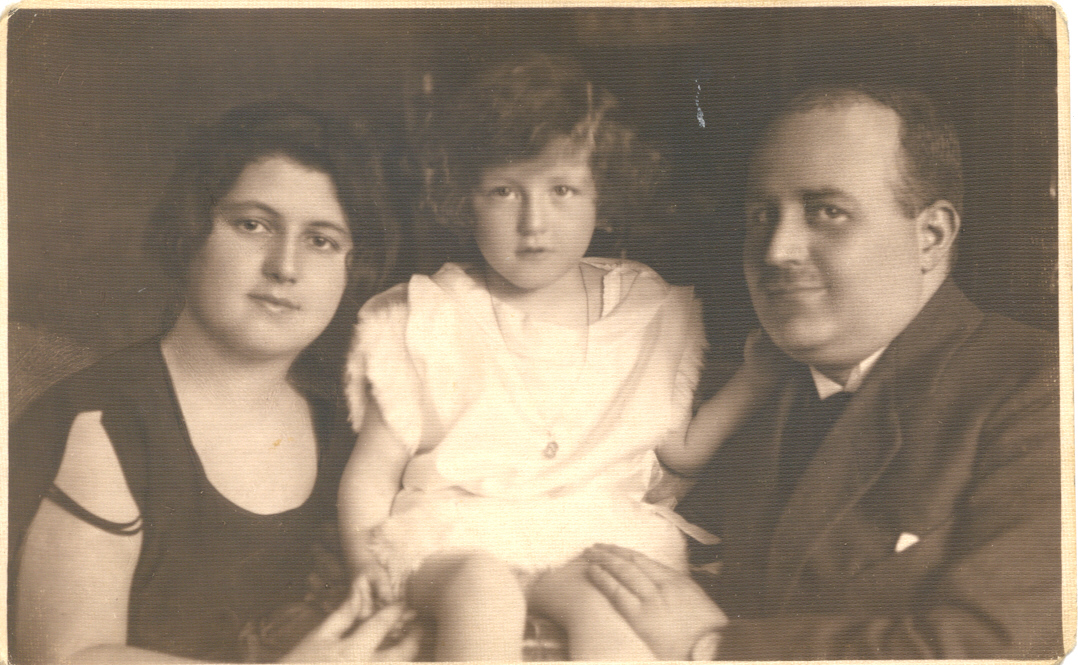
Dezső Sebeok and Vera Perlmann and their son Thomas (c. 1924)

Thomas Albert Sebeok (Hungarian: Sebők Tamás, pronounced [ˈʃɛbøːk ˈtɒmaːʃ]; November 9, 1920 – December 21, 2001) was a Hungarian-born American polymath, semiotician, and linguist. As one of the founders of the biosemiotics field, he studied non-human and cross-species signaling and communication. He is also known for his work in the development of long-term nuclear waste warning messages, in which he worked with the Human Interference Task Force (established 1981) to create methods for keeping the inhabitants of Earth away from buried nuclear waste that will still be hazardous 10,000 or more years in the future.

== Early life and education ==
Sebeok was born on November 9, 1920, in Budapest, Hungary. He attended secondary school at the famous Fasori Gimnázium, which educated notables such as John von Neumann and Eugene Wigner. After a brief stint at Magdalene College, Cambridge University in England, he moved to the United States at the age of 17 and became a naturalized citizen in 1944. Sebeok earned a bachelor's degree in 1941 at the University of Chicago. He earned a master's degree in anthropological linguistics, under the external guidance of Roman Jakobson, at Princeton University in 1943 and, in 1945, a doctorate in oriental languages and civilizations at Princeton University; his dissertation was titled Finnish and Hungarian case systems: their form and function.

== Academic work ==
In 1943, Sebeok started work at Indiana University in Bloomington, assisting the Amerindianist Carl Voegelin in managing the country's largest Army Specialized Training Program in foreign languages. He then created the university's department of Uralic and Altaic Studies (now Central Eurasian Studies), covering the languages of Eastern Europe, Russia and Asia. He was also the chair of the university's Research Center for Language and Semiotic Studies.

As a professor at Indiana University, Sebeok studied both human and non-human systems of signaling and communication, as well as the philosophy of mind. He was among the founders of biosemiotics, and coined the term "zoosemiotics" in 1963 to describe the development of signals and signs by non-human animal species. He also continued his work as a linguist, publishing several articles and books analyzing aspects of the Mari language (referring to it by the name "Cheremis"). His transdisciplinary work and professional collaborations spanned the fields of anthropology, biology, folklore studies, linguistics, psychology, and semiotics.

Sebeok was the editor-in-chief of the journal Semiotica, the leading periodical in the field, from its establishing in 1969 until 2001. He was also the editor of several book series and encyclopedias, including Approaches to Semiotics (over 100 volumes), Current Trends in Linguistics, and the Encyclopedic Dictionary of Semiotics.

In 1980, Sebeok along with Robert Rosenthal participated in a conference named "The Clever Hans Phenomenon: Communication with Horses, Whales, Apes and People" held by the New York Academy of Sciences which casts doubt upon the research efforts regarding ape communication, including but not limited to the works of Herbert S. Terrace, Duane Rumbaugh and Sue Savage-Rumbaugh. In particular, the conference suggests that the apes could have been cued or their communication had been misinterpretated.

Later in the early 1980s, Sebeok composed a report for the US Office of Nuclear Waste Management titled Communication Measures To Bridge Ten Millennia, discussing solutions to the problem of nuclear semiotics, a system of signs aimed at warning future civilizations from entering geographic areas contaminated by nuclear waste. The report proposed a "folkloric relay system" and the establishment of an "atomic priesthood" of physicists, anthropologists, and semioticians to create and preserve a common cultural narrative of the hazardous nature of nuclear waste sites.

In addition to his academic work, Sebeok organized hundreds of international conferences and institutes, held leadership roles in organizations such as the Linguistic Society of America, International Association for Semiotic Studies, Committee for Skeptical Inquiry, and the Semiotic Society of America, and supported the creation of linguistic and semiotics teaching programs and scholarly associations throughout the world.

Sebeok's personal library on semiotics, comprising more than 4,000 volumes of books and 700 journals, is preserved at the Department of Semiotics at the University of Tartu in Estonia. His correspondence and research files are held by the Indiana University Archives.

== Personal life ==
Sebeok married Mary Eleanor Lawton (1912–2005) in 1947. They had one child, Veronica C. Wald, and later divorced. Sebeok married Donna Jean Umiker (born 1946, now D. Jean Umiker-Sebeok), a fellow semiotic scholar and his frequent collaborator and co-author, in 1973, and they had two children, Jessica A. Sebeok and Erica L. Sebeok. Sebeok retired from Indiana University in 1991, but he contributed to the field of semiotics until his death in 2001.

== Sebeok Fellow Award ==
The Sebeok Fellow Award "recognizes outstanding contributions to the development of the doctrine of signs" and is the highest honor given by the Semiotic Society of America. It is awarded every 2 to 4 years. Recipients have included David Savan (1992), John Deely (1993), Paul Bouissac (1996), Jesper Hoffmeyer (2000), Kalevi Kull (2003), Floyd Merrell (2005), Susan Petrilli (2008), Irmengard Rauch (2011), Paul Cobley (2014), Vincent Colapietro (2018), Nathan Houser (2019), Marcel Danesi (2024), Lucia Santaella (2025), Richard L. Lanigan (2026).

== Selected English publications ==
- Sebeok, Thomas A. (1942). "An Examination of the Austroasiatic Language Family". Language. 18 (3): 206–217. doi:10.2307/409554. JSTOR 409554.
- Bonfante, G.; Sebeok, Thomas A. (1944). "Linguistics and the Age and Area Hypothesis". American Anthropologist. 46 (3): 382–386. doi:10.1525/aa.1944.46.3.02a00100. JSTOR 663436.
- Gunda, Béla; Sebeok, Thomas A. (1947). "Work and Cult among the Hungarian Peasants". Southwestern Journal of Anthropology. 3 (2): 147–163. doi:10.1086/soutjanth.3.2.3628730. JSTOR 3628730. S2CID 147181353.
- Sebeok, Thomas A.; Baughman, Ernest W. (1949). "A New Collection of Hungarian Folktales". Hoosier Folklore. 8 (2/3): 50–66. JSTOR 27649978.
- Sebeok, Thomas A.; Lane, Evelyn (1949). "The Cheremis Folksong: A Soviet Viewpoint". The Slavonic and East European Review. 28 (70): 139–151. JSTOR 4204100.
- Sebeok, Thomas A. (1959). "Folksong Viewed as Code and Message. A Cheremis Sonnet". Anthropos. 54 (1/2): 141–153. JSTOR 40454330.
- Sebeok, Thomas A., ed. Style in Language. New York and London: The Technology Press of Massachusetts Institute of Technology and John Wiley & Sons, 1960. ISBN 9780262190077
- Sebeok, Thomas A. (1965). "Animal Communication". Science. 147 (3661): 1006–1014. Bibcode:1965Sci...147.1006S. doi:10.1126/science.147.3661.1006. JSTOR 1715212. PMID 14245775. S2CID 22727597.
- Sebeok, Thomas A. (1967). "Aspects of Animal Communication: The Bees and Porpoises". Etc: A Review of General Semantics. 24 (1): 59–83. JSTOR 42574310.
- Sebeok, Thomas A. (1968). ""Zoosemiotics"". American Speech. 43 (2): 142–144. doi:10.2307/454548. JSTOR 454548.
- Umiker-Sebeok, Jean; Sebeok, Thomas A. (1981). "Clever Hans and Smart Simians: The Self-Fulfilling Prophecy and Kindred Methodological Pitfalls". Anthropos. 76 (1/2): 89–165. JSTOR 40460295.
- Sebeok, Thomas A, Donna J. Umiker-Sebeok, and Adam Kendon. Nonverbal Communication, Interaction, and Gesture: Selections from Semiotica. The Hague: Mouton Publishers, 1981.
- Eco, Umberto; Sebeok, Thomas A., eds. (1984). The Sign of Three: Dupin, Holmes, Peirce. Bloomington, IN: History Workshop, Indiana University Press. ISBN 978-0-253-35235-4., 236 pages. Ten essays on methods of abductive inference in Poe's Dupin, Doyle's Holmes, Peirce and many others.
- Sebeok, Thomas A, Marcia E. Erickson, Umberto Eco, V V. Ivanov, and Mônica Rector. Carnival! Berlin: Mouton Publishers, 1984.
- Sebeok, Thomas A, Donna J. Umiker-Sebeok, and Evan P. Young. The Semiotic Web, 1989. Berlin: Mouton de Gruyter, 1990.
- Sebeok, Thomas A, and Marcel Danesi. The Forms of Meaning: Modeling Systems Theory and Semiotic Analysis, 2000.
- Sebeok, Thomas A. Signs: An Introduction to Semiotics. Toronto, Ont: University of Toronto Press, 2001.
