= Biosemiotics =

Biology interpreted as a sign system

Biosemiotics (from the Greek βίος bios, "life" and σημειωτικός sēmeiōtikos, "observant of signs") is a field of semiotics and biology that studies the prelinguistic meaning-making, biological interpretation processes, production of signs and codes and communication processes in the biological realm.

Biosemiotics integrates the findings of biology and semiotics and proposes a paradigmatic shift in the scientific view of life, in which semiosis (sign process, including meaning and interpretation) is one of its immanent and intrinsic features. The term biosemiotic was first used by Friedrich S. Rothschild in 1962, but Thomas Sebeok, Thure von Uexküll, Jesper Hoffmeyer and many others have implemented the term and field. The field is generally divided between theoretical and applied biosemiotics.

Insights from biosemiotics have also been adopted in the humanities and social sciences, including human–animal studies, human–plant studies and cybersemiotics.

== Definition ==
Biosemiotics is the study of meaning making processes in the living realm, or, to elaborate, a study of

- signification, communication and habit formation of living processes
- semiosis (creating and changing sign relations) in living nature
- the biological basis of all signs and sign interpretation
- interpretative processes, codes and cognition in organisms

== Main branches ==
According to the basic types of semiosis under study, biosemiotics can be divided into

- vegetative semiotics (also endosemiotics, or phytosemiotics), the study of semiosis at the cellular and molecular level (including the translation processes related to genome and the organic form or phenotype); vegetative semiosis occurs in all organisms at their cellular and tissue level; vegetative semiotics includes prokaryote semiotics, sign-mediated interactions in bacteria communities such as quorum sensing and quorum quenching.
- zoosemiotics or animal semiotics, or the study of animal forms of knowing; animal semiosis occurs in the organisms with neuromuscular system, also includes anthroposemiotics, the study of semiotic behavior in humans.

According to the dominant aspect of semiosis under study, the following labels have been used: biopragmatics, biosemantics, and biosyntactics.

== History ==
Apart from Charles Sanders Peirce (1839–1914) and Charles W. Morris (1903–1979), early pioneers of biosemiotics were Jakob von Uexküll (1864–1944), Heini Hediger (1908–1992), Giorgio Prodi (1928–1987), Marcel Florkin (1900–1979) and Friedrich S. Rothschild (1899–1995); the founding fathers of the contemporary interdiscipline were Thomas Sebeok (1920–2001) and Thure von Uexküll (1908–2004).

In the 1980s a circle of mathematicians active in Theoretical Biology, René Thom (Institut des Hautes Etudes Scientifiques), Yannick Kergosien (Dalhousie University and Institut des Hautes Etudes Scientifiques), and Robert Rosen (Dalhousie University, also a former member of the Buffalo group with Howard H. Pattee), explored the relations between Semiotics and Biology using such headings as "Nature Semiotics", "Semiophysics", or "Anticipatory Systems" and taking a modeling approach.

The contemporary period (as initiated by Copenhagen-Tartu school) include biologists Jesper Hoffmeyer, Kalevi Kull, Claus Emmeche, Terrence Deacon, semioticians Martin Krampen, Paul Cobley, philosophers Donald Favareau, John Deely, John Collier and complex systems scientists Howard H. Pattee, Michael Conrad, Luis M. Rocha, Cliff Joslyn and León Croizat.

In 2001, an annual international conference for biosemiotic research known as the Gatherings in Biosemiotics was inaugurated, and has taken place every year since.

In 2004, a group of biosemioticians – Marcello Barbieri, Claus Emmeche, Jesper Hoffmeyer, Kalevi Kull, and Anton Markoš – decided to establish an international journal of biosemiotics. Under their editorship, the Journal of Biosemiotics was launched by Nova Science Publishers in 2005 (two issues published), and with the same five co-editors Biosemiotics was launched by Springer in 2008. The book series Biosemiotics (Springer), edited by Claus Emmeche, Donald Favareau, Kalevi Kull, and Alexei Sharov, began in 2007 and 27 volumes have been published in the series by 2024.

The International Society for Biosemiotic Studies was established in 2005 by Donald Favareau and the five editors listed above. A collective programmatic paper on the basic theses of biosemiotics appeared in 2009. and in 2010, an 800 page textbook and anthology, Essential Readings in Biosemiotics, was published, with bibliographies and commentary by Donald Favareau.

One of roots for biosemiotics has been medical semiotics. In 2021 a book edited by Yogi Hendlin and Jonathan Hope appeared, Food and Medicine: A Biosemiotic Perspective (Springer Series in Biosemiotics), which addressed medical and health semiotics.

=== In the humanities ===
Since the work of Jakob von Uexküll and Martin Heidegger, several scholars in the humanities have engaged with or appropriated ideas from biosemiotics in their own projects; conversely, biosemioticians have critically engaged with or reformulated humanistic theories using ideas from biosemiotics and complexity theory. For instance, Andreas Weber has reformulated some of Hans Jonas's ideas using concepts from biosemiotics, and biosemiotics have been used to interpret the poetry of John Burnside.

Since 2021, the American philosopher Jason Josephson Storm has drawn on biosemiotics and empirical research on animal communication to propose hylosemiotics, a theory of ontology and communication that Storm believes could allow the humanities to move beyond the linguistic turn.

John Deely's work also represents an engagement between humanistic and biosemiotic approaches. Deely was trained as a historian and not a biologist but discussed biosemiotics and zoosemiotics extensively in his introductory works on semiotics and clarified terms that are relevant for biosemiotics. Although his idea of physiosemiotics was criticized by practicing biosemioticians, Paul Cobley, Donald Favareau, and Kalevi Kull wrote that "the debates on this conceptual point between Deely and the biosemiotics community were always civil and marked by a mutual admiration for the contributions of the other towards the advancement of our understanding of sign relations."

=== Artificial intelligence and biosemiotics ===
Recent developments in biosemiotics have increasingly engaged with the rise of artificial intelligence and machine learning approaches in the study of animal communication and ecological sign systems. While computational models have demonstrated significant capacity in identifying patterns in large-scale bioacoustic datasets, scholars in biosemiotics have emphasized that such approaches remain grounded in a fundamentally information-theoretic paradigm that differs from the Peircean conception of semiosis as a triadic and context-dependent process.

From a biosemiotic perspective, meaning cannot be reduced to signal transmission or statistical regularities, but emerges from the relational dynamics between organisms and their Umwelten, in which perception, action, and ecological context are inseparable. In this sense, AI-based systems are interpreted not as neutral translators of animal communication, but as semiotic operators that reconfigure data into computationally legible structures, thereby producing new forms of mediation rather than direct access to animal meaning.

Some recent contributions have further argued that AI should be understood as a heuristic and epistemological instrument capable of revealing the limits of reductionist approaches to communication. Rather than providing direct translation of animal semiosis, computational systems may function as “differential tools” that highlight the irreducibility of embodied, situated meaning-making processes in living systems.

This line of inquiry has also emphasized the ethical and ecological implications of AI-mediated interpretations of non-human communication, suggesting that biosemiotics can provide a theoretical framework for critically assessing both the possibilities and the limits of computational approaches to life as semiosis.

== See also ==
- Animal communication
- Biocommunication (science)
- Cognitive biology
- Ecosemiotics
- Mimicry
- Naturalization of intentionality
- Neurosemiotics
- Phytosemiotics
- Plant communication
- Zoosemiotics

== Bibliography ==
- Alexander, V. N. (2011). The Biologist's Mistress: Rethinking Self-Organization in Art, Literature and Nature. Litchfield Park AZ: Emergent Publications.
- Barbieri, Marcello (ed.) (2008). The Codes of Life: The Rules of Macroevolution. Berlin: Springer.
- Emmeche, Claus; Kull, Kalevi (eds.) (2011). Towards a Semiotic Biology: Life is the Action of Signs. London: Imperial College Press.
- Emmeche, Claus; Kalevi Kull and Frederik Stjernfelt. (2002): Reading Hoffmeyer, Rethinking Biology. (Tartu Semiotics Library 3). Tartu: Tartu University Press.
- Favareau, D. (ed.) (2010). Essential Readings in Biosemiotics: Anthology and Commentary. Berlin: Springer.
- Favareau, D. (2006). The evolutionary history of biosemiotics. In "Introduction to Biosemiotics: The New Biological Synthesis." Marcello Barbieri (Ed.) Berlin: Springer. pp 1–67.
- Hoffmeyer, Jesper. (1996): Signs of Meaning in the Universe. Bloomington: Indiana University Press. (special issue of Semiotica vol. 120 (no.3-4), 1998, includes 13 reviews of the book and a rejoinder by the author).
- Hoffmeyer, Jesper (2008). Biosemiotics: An Examination into the Signs of Life and the Life of Signs. Scranton: University of Scranton Press.
- Hoffmeyer, Jesper (ed.)(2008). A Legacy for Living Systems: Gregory Bateson as a Precursor to Biosemiotics. Berlin: Springer.
- Hoffmeyer Jesper; Kull, Kalevi (2003): Baldwin and Biosemiotics: What Intelligence Is For. In: Bruce H. Weber and David J. Depew (eds.), Evolution and Learning - The Baldwin Effect Reconsidered'. Cambridge: The MIT Press.
- Kull, Kalevi, eds. (2001). Jakob von Uexküll: A Paradigm for Biology and Semiotics. Berlin & New York: Mouton de Gruyter. [ = Semiotica vol. 134 (no.1-4)].
- Rothschild, Friedrich S. (2000). Creation and Evolution: A Biosemiotic Approach. Edison, New Jersey: Transaction Publishers.
- Sebeok, Thomas A.; Umiker-Sebeok, Jean (eds.) (1992): Biosemiotics. The Semiotic Web 1991. Berlin and New York: Mouton de Gruyter.
- Sebeok, Thomas A.; Hoffmeyer, Jesper; Emmeche, Claus (eds.) (1999). Biosemiotica. Berlin & New York: Mouton de Gruyter. [ = Semiotica vol. 127 (no.1-4)].
- Tønnessen, Morten; Maran, Timo; Sharov, Alexei (2018). "Phenomenology and Biosemiotics". Biosemiotics. 11 (3): 323–330. doi:10.1007/s12304-018-9345-8. ISSN 1875-1350. S2CID 54020391.
- Zengiaro, N. (2025). “Translating the wild: AI, semiotics, and the future of animal communication.” Digital Age in Semiotics & Communication, 8, 178–205. https://doi.org/10.33919/dasc.25.8.10
- Zengiaro, Nicola (2025). “For a semiotic of opacity: the role of biosemiotics between AI and animal communication.” Chinese Semiotic Studies, 21(4), 567–594. https://doi.org/10.1515/css-2025-0009
- Zengiaro, Nicola (2025). “AI and Animal Communication: A Generative Zoosemiotics Perspective.” Linguistic Frontiers (ahead of print), Palacký University Olomouc. https://doi.org/10.2478/lf-2025-0021
