= Lotman =

Lotman is a surname. Notable people with the surname include:

- Aleksei Lotman (born 1960), Estonian biologist, son of Juri Lotman
- Herb Lotman (1933–2014), U.S. food industry magnate
- Juri Lotman (1922–1993), Russian formalist critic, semiotician, and culturologist
- Mihhail Lotman (born 1952), son of Juri Lotman, Estonian literature researcher and politician
