= Estonian Science Communication Award =

Estonian science award

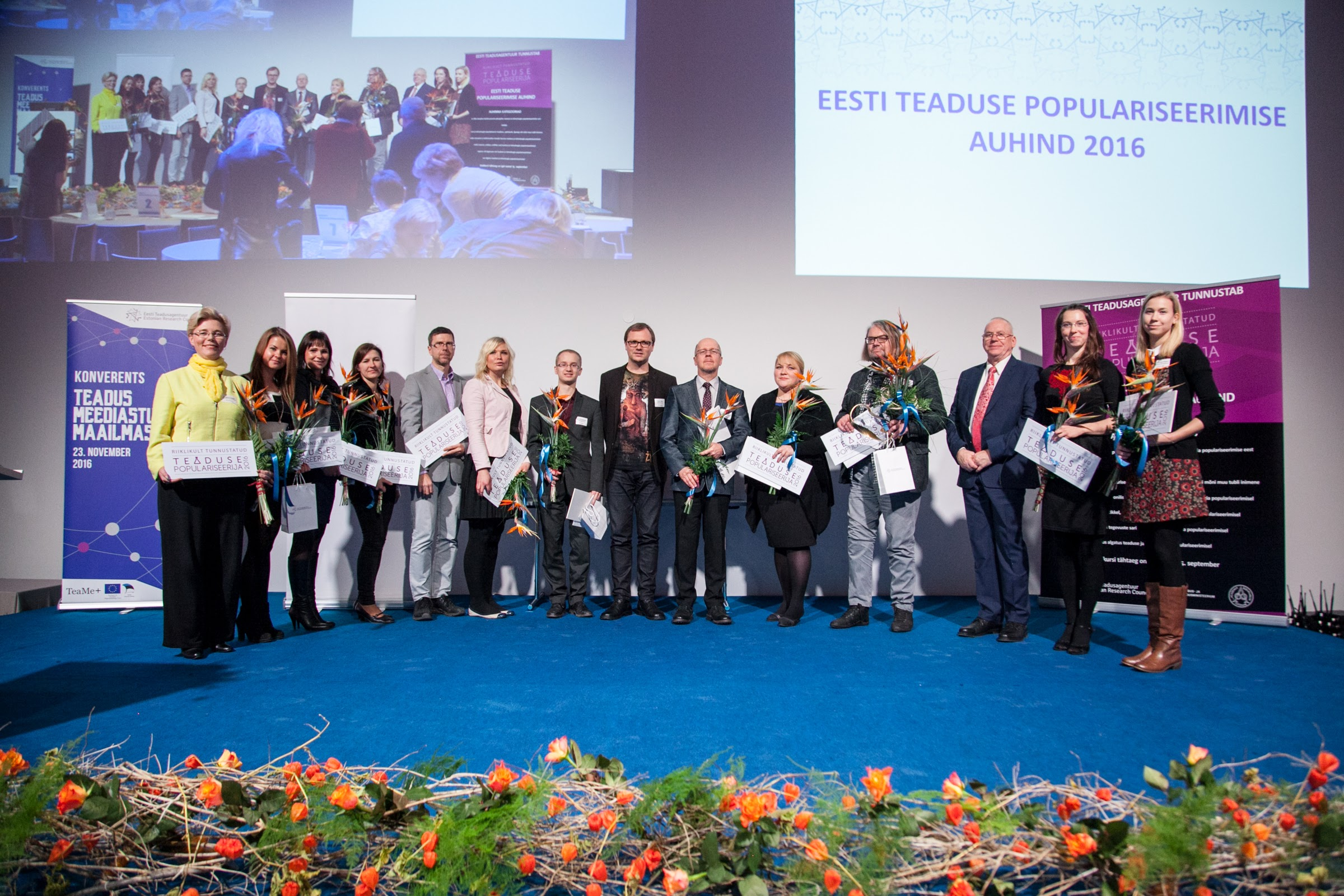
Recipients of the Estonian Science Communication Award in 2016

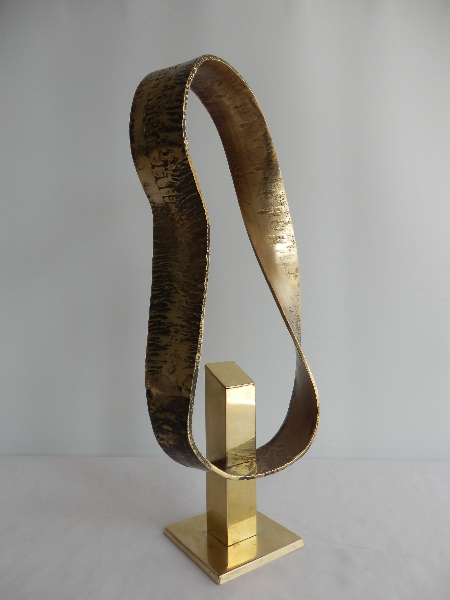
The lifetime achievement award is accompanied by the brass table sculpture Möbius Leaf by the sculptor Stanislav Netšvolodov.

The Estonian Science Communication Award (Estonian: Eesti teaduse populariseerimise auhind) is an Estonian award given to an individual or group for the popularization of science since 2006.

The award is financed by the Ministry of Education and Research and is issued jointly by the Estonian Academy of Sciences and the Estonian Research Council.

The award is presented in six categories:

- The lifetime achievement award for long-term systematic popularization of science and technology;
- Popularization of science and technology through audiovisual and electronic media;
- Popularization of science and technology through print media;
- Activities or series of activities popularizing science and technology;
- The best researcher, journalist, or teacher popularizing science and technology; and
- The best new initiative in popularizing science and technology.

The Lifetime Achievement Award was conferred for the first time in 2010. Since 2012, the Lifetime Achievement Award has been named after Tiiu Sild, and the monetary award is accompanied by the brass table sculpture Möbiuse leht (Möbius Leaf) by the sculptor Stanislav Netšvolodov.

== Recipients ==
- 2012: Rakett 69
- 2020: Toomas Kukk, grand prize
- 2020: Jüri Engelbrecht, lifetime achievement award
- 2021: Mari Uusküla, incentive prize
- 2021: Tõnu Viik, lifetime achievement award
