= Tartu–Moscow Semiotic School =

Semiotic organization led by Juri Lotman

The Tartu–Moscow Semiotic School is a scientific school of thought in the field of semiotics that was formed in 1964 and led by Juri Lotman. Among the other members of this school were Boris Uspenskij, Vyacheslav Ivanov, Vladimir Toporov, Mikhail Gasparov, Alexander Piatigorsky, Isaak I. Revzin, and others. As a result of their collective work, they established a theoretical framework around the semiotics of culture.

== History ==
The Tartu–Moscow School of Semiotics developed an original method of multidimensional cultural analysis. The languages of culture are interpreted as secondary modelling systems in relation to verbal language. This method permits a productive understanding of the use of different languages of culture.

This school is widely known for its journal, Sign Systems Studies (formerly published in Russian as Труды по знаковым системам), published by Tartu University Press. It is the oldest semiotics journal in the world, established in 1964.

In its first period, the 1960s and 1970s, TMSS followed a structuralist approach and was strongly influenced by Russian formalism. The term "semiotics" was banned in the Soviet Union at that time, and the researchers used the obfuscated term "secondary modeling systems" (Russian: Вторичные моделирующие системы) coined by Juri Lotman and Vladimir Uspensky, in the name of the Tartu Summer Schools on semiotics.

Since the 1980s, the approach of TMSS can be characterized as post-structuralist (highly dynamic and complex), and is connected with the introduction of Juri Lotman's concept of semiosphere and its relation to organicism.

From the 1990s, TMSS has been succeeded by the Tartu Semiotics School, which is based in the Department of Semiotics of the University of Tartu and led by Kalevi Kull, Peeter Torop, Mihhail Lotman, Timo Maran, and others.

== Semiotics of culture ==
The semiotics of culture is a research field within general semiotics founded by the Tartu-Moscow School. It originated in the structural linguistics of Ferdinand de Saussure, the ideas of Russian Formalism, and the Prague Linguistic Circle, alongside various individual theorists, although the theories developed in the semiotics of culture (especially its later iterations) depart radically from these influences. Juri Lotman is considered the main representative of the semiotics of culture.

Terms central to the semiotics of culture include "text", "modeling system", "language", Lotman's conception of the "semiosphere", and of course "culture" itself. While its ideas were being formulated in the 1960s, an official birth year for the semiotics of culture could be marked as 1973, when Lotman - alongside Vjacheslav V. Ivanov, Aleksandr M. Pjatigorskij, Vladimir N. Toporov, and Boris A. Uspenskij - first published the manifesto "Theses on the semiotic study of cultures (as applied to Slavic texts)".

The Text, considered the foundational tool of the School, is used to view the boundaries of a material creation, experience, occurrence, etc., particularly those things that are culturally integrated or artistic. With the boundary of content set, the interrelations between it and exterior texts can be more clearly examined. As the boundaries are variable there is no strict definition of how a Text can be made of subject matter, and instead it emphasizes the cultural signification seen in comparing the boundaries of the text to its use in society. A general statement of the research program of the semiotics of culture is that it aims to examine the entire aggregate of sign systems as united by culture, to ascertain their number, their hierarchy, their mutual influence, or their functional correlation, both synchronically and diachronically.

== Semiosphere ==
The semiosphere is a concept of Juri Lotman's and one that is central to the later semiotics of culture, and as a concept it is given explicit characterization in an article of Lotman's first published in 1984.

The semiosphere is the semiotic space outside of which semiosis cannot exist. The semiosphere precedes any individual text or isolated language, it is the "greater system" outside of which language does not only function, it does not even exist. The principal attribute of the semiosphere is the presence of a boundary, which translates external communications into understandable information. The division between the core (completely semioticized) and the periphery (partially semioticized, in constant flux with the asemiotic) is a law of the internal organization of the semiosphere. The semiosphere is an exceptionally dynamic mechanism with synchronic and diachronic dimensions and multiple codes engaging with each other.

== Tartu-Moscow School ==
In the early 1960s and as a result of various summer schools organized in Estonia, the Tartu-Moscow School was established. With Juri Lotman as its main representative, the Tartu-Moscow School developed the tradition of the semiotics of culture. In 1973, Lotman, Vjacheslav V. Ivanov, Aleksandr M. Pjatigorskij, Vladimir N. Toporov, and Boris A. Uspenskij first published the manifesto Theses on the semiotic study of cultures (as applied to Slavic texts), which laid the foundation for the semiotics of culture and represents a milestone for the school.

The theoretical origins of the school lie in the structural linguistics of Ferdinand de Saussure, the ideas of Russian Formalism, and the Prague Linguistic Circle, alongside other individual theorists, although the theories developed in the semiotics of culture (especially its later iterations) depart radically from these influences. The school is considered one very distinct and innovative branch of general semiotics, and during its development a controversial one. Alongside the five authors mentioned, the school had a broad international membership, and amongst this decentralized constituency there is a great diversity in publications covering a wide variety of topics. A brief timeline may help contextualize:

- Late 1950s - Moscow mathematical linguistics paves way for cybernetic theories of culture
- 1960s - Semiotics born out of cybernetics and information theory. USSR supported development in linguistics. Juri Lotman's associate Igor Černov connects Moscow and Estonian intellectuals. Estonian interest in structuralism, alongside Tartu support for Russian Studies, makes such crossover easy.
- 1970s - Theses on Semiotics of Culture written collectively. Some key figures from Moscow emigrated from USSR.
- 1980s - Connections between Moscow and Tartu weakened. Lotman coined the concept of semiosphere, and wrote important works, among these "Universe of the Mind" and "Unpredictable mechanisms of Culture".
- 1990s and onwards - Tartu School, which is characterised by integration of biosemiotics and semiotics of culture.

The Tartu-Moscow School of semiotics was formed when a diverse group of scholars joined informally from the 1950s to 1980s to provide alternatives to the regnant Soviet approaches to language, literature and culture. Their work develops the linguistics of Saussure, elaborated by Trubetzkoi and Hjelmslev. They subsequently came to treat art works and other cultural artifacts as the products of ‘secondary modelling systems’, that is, as elements arranged according to rules that could be seen as language-like and hence accessible to analysis by the procedures of structuralist linguistics. Opoyaz, the Moscow Linguistic Circle and the Prague Linguistic Circle the predecessors of TMS The group shared an interest in the Russian formalists and in contemporary linguistics, semiotics and cybernetics. During the 1970s prominent members of the group, such as Juri Lotman and Boris Uspenskii, turned from more theoretical and formalized work to historical studies of culture as a system of semiotic systems.

Lotman: "The alumni of Moscow University and Leningrad University formed the Soviet school of semiotics as a synthesis of these two traditions in the humanities. To them, a third tradition was added: the University of Tartu. It was not a mere chance: the University of Tartu had its own, well-established linguistic school, and, moreover, was always characterized by a high spirit of academic tolerance, an openness to all-Europe cultural trends. [From: Lotman, Juri. 2016[1982]. Universitet – nauka – kul’tura [University – science – culture]. In: Lotman, Juri M.; Uspenskij Boris A. Perepiska 1964–1993. Tallinn: Tallinn University Press, 679–688.]

A distinctive feature of TMS was the combination of structuralist and semiotic approaches to language, literature and culture.

== Theses on the semiotic study of cultures (as applied to Slavic texts) ==
Consisting of nine “theses”, the manifesto Theses on the semiotic study of cultures (as applied to Slavic texts) laid the foundation for the semiotics of culture and represents a milestone in the legacy of the Tartu-Moscow School. It was co-authored by Juri M. Lotman, Vjacheslav V. Ivanov, Aleksandr M. Pjatigorskij, Vladimir N. Toporov, and Boris A. Uspenskij.

The first two theses describe the research program of the semiotics of culture, and the third through to the ninth describe various considerations and concepts relevant to culture and its study through the use of the Text as an analytic tool. A condensed and abridged summary could read as follows - Cultures can be studied through semiotic inquiry, as its building blocks are “texts”. Texts are the qualitative tool used to analyze cultures, and many things can be a text. Culture can be considered as a series of texts, a supercode of textuality, or a memory storage pattern utilizing texts.

The paradigmatic shift in Lotman's works of the 1980s (from “signs” to “texts”, from the binary understanding of meaning to the “clusters of meanings” typical of complex texts) was just a further step in his permanent effort to illustrate tension between the individual-singular and the systemic-holistic.

The notion of meaning-generation and amplification and the view on the artistic text as a device that performs a very important and complex work by activating linguistic, cultural, and psychological resources became a key topic in many TMS publications.

In a work of art, the creative function of language, its ability to produce new meanings, is especially and intensely felt, thanks to which the text becomes a capacitor of cultural memory: an increase in complexity results from constant re-contextualization and re-reading that amplifies the text's informational richness.

The TMS’ initial impetus toward “exact knowledge” in the humanities branched into a whole array of various approaches, developed by the school's participants: bright thinkers whose paths ultimately drifted apart. Their dialogue considerably increased reflection on their own theoretical premises, frameworks, and procedures, yet did not yield a general synthesis.

== Cultural semiotics ==
Cultural semiotics has developed from linguistic semiotics via text semiotics towards the semiotics of semiosphere.

1st Phase Cultural semiotics started from the realization that in a semiotical sense culture is a multilanguage system, where, in parallel to natural languages, there exist secondary modelling systems (mythology, ideology, ethics etc.), which are based on natural languages, or which employ natural languages for their description or explanation (music, ballet) or language analogization ("language" of theatre, "language" of movies).

The Soviet semiotics was rooted in tradition developed not by pure linguists, as it has been in Europe, and especially in the United States, but also on ideas produced by literary scientists, especially in the OPOYAZ, Moscow Linguistic Circle and other formal and informal groups of the twenties combined both linguistic and literary interests. TMS that developed in sixties sought actively incorporate elements of formalists legacy, but as not a simple revival of formalist. Even in the first volume of Trudy po znakovõm sistemam (Lectures on structural poetics 1964), Lotman was quite critical to pure formalist statement and methods.

2nd phase The next step was to introduce the concept of text as the principal concept of cultural semiotics (Chernov text as “main hero” of TMS), since as a term it can denote both a discrete artefact and an invisible abstract whole (a mental text in collective consciousness or subconsciousness). Text and textualisation symbolize the definition of the object of study; the textual aspect of text analysis means the operation with clearly defined sign systems, texts or combinations of texts. The processual aspect of text analysis presupposes definition, construction or reconstruction of a whole. Thus the analysis assembles the concrete and the abstract, the static and the dynamic in one concept—the text.

3rd phase Yet the analysis of a defined object is static, and the need to also take into account cultural dynamics led Juri Lotman to introduce the notion of semiosphere. Although the attributes of semiosphere resemble those of text (definability, structurality, coherence), it is an important shift from the point of view of culture's analyzability. Human culture constitutes the global semiosphere, but that global system consists of intertwined semiospheres of different times (diachrony of semiosphere) and different levels (synchrony of semiosphere). Each semiosphere can be analyzed as a single whole, yet we need to bear in mind that each analyzed whole in culture is a part of a greater whole, which is an important methodological principle. It is an infinite dialogue of whole and parts and the dynamics of the whole dimension.

== See also ==
- Copenhagen–Tartu school
- Prague linguistic circle

== Literature ==
- Andrews, Edna 2003. Conversations with Lotman. The Implications of Cultural Semiotics in Language, Literature, and Cognition. Toronto: University of Toronto Press.
- Avtonomova, Natalia S. 2001. L’héritage de Lotman. Critique 57: 120–132.
- Baran, Hendryk 1976. Introduction. In: Baran, Henryk (ed.) Semiotics and Structuralism: Readings from the Soviet Union. White Plains (N.Y.): International Arts and Sciences Press, VII-XXVI.
- Cáceres, M. 1999. Scientific thought and work of Yuri Lotman. Sign Systems Studies 27: 46–59.
- Chang, Han-liang; Han, Lei; Wu, Shuo-yu Charlotte 2014. The reception of Tartu semiotics in China: A preliminary survey and a few case studies. Chinese Semiotic Studies 10(1): 133–163.
- Chernov, Igor 1988. Historical Survey of Tartu–Moscow Semiotic School. In: Semiotics of Culture. Proceedings of the 25th Symposium of the Tartu-Moscow School of Semiotics, Imatra, Finland, 27–29 July 1987 (ed. H. Broms, R. Kaufmann), Helsinki: Arator, 7–16.
- Grishakova, Marina. 2009. Around Culture and Explosion. J. Lotman and the Tartu-Moscow School in the 1980-1990s. In: Lotman, Juri.Culture and Explosion. Ed. by Marina Grishakova. Trans. W. Clark. Semiotics, Communication, and Cognition, vol. 1. Berlin: De Gruyter, 2009.
- Grishakova, Marina; Salupere, Silvi. A School in the Woods: Tartu-Moscow Semiotics. In: Grishakova, M. and S. Salupere, eds. Theoretical Schools and Circles in the Twentieth-Century Humanities: Literary Theory, History, Philosophy. Routledge, 2015.
- Ivanov, Vyacheslav V. 1978. The Science of Semiotics.
- Lotman, Juri. 2009. Culture and Explosion. Ed. by Marina Grishakova. Trans. W. Clark. Semiotics, Communication, and Cognition, vol. 1. Berlin: De Gruyter.
- Lotman, Juri M. 1977. The Structure of the Artistic Text. Transl. University of Michigan. Brown University Press.
- Lotman, Juri M. 2005. On the semiosphere. Sign Systems Studies 33(1), 205–229.
- Kull, Kalevi 2001. Juri Lotman in English: Bibliography. Sign Systems Studies 39(2/4): 343–356.
- Kull, Kalevi; Gramigna, Remo 2014. Juri Lotman in English: Updates to bibliography. Sign Systems Studies 42(4): 549–552.
- Pilshchikov, Igor; Trunin, Mikhail 2016. The Tartu-Moscow School of Semiotics in Transnational Perspective. Sign Systems Studies 44(3): 368–401.
- Rudy, S. 1986. Semiotics in the USSR. In: Sebeok, T. A.; Umiker-Sebeok, J. (eds.), The Semiotic Sphere. Nueva York: Plenum Press, 555–582.
- Salupere, Silvi; Torop, Peeter; Kull, Kalevi (eds.) 2013. Beginnings of the Semiotics of Culture. (Tartu Semiotics Library 13.) Tartu: University of Tartu Press.
- Segal, Dmitri 1974. Aspects of Structuralism in Soviet Philology. Tel-Aviv: Papers on Poetics and Semiotics, 2. http://www.tau.ac.il/tarbut/pubtexts/segal/Segal-Aspects.pdf
- Semenenko, Aleksei 2012. The Texture of Culture: An Introduction to Yuri Lotman's Semiotic Theory. New York: Palgrave Macmillan.
- Seyffert, Peter 1985. Soviet Literary Structuralism: Background, Debate, Issues. Columbus, Ohio: Slavica Publishers.
- Shukman, Ann 1976. The Canonization of the Real. Jurij Lotman's Theory of Literature and Analysis of Poetry. PTL: A Journal for Descriptive Poetics and Theory of Literature 1: 317–338.
- Shukman, Ann 1977. Literature and Semiotics. A study of the writings of Yu. M. Lotman. Amsterdam: North Holland Publishing Company.
- Shukman, Ann 1978. Soviet Semiotics and Literary Criticism. New Literary History, Volume 9, No. 2 Soviet Semiotics and Criticism: An Anthology. Johns Hopkins University Press.
- Uspenskij, B. A.; Ivanov, V. V.; Toporov, V. N.; Pjatigorskij, A. M.; Lotman, J. M. 1973. Theses on the semiotic study of cultures (as applied to Slavic texts). In: Eng, Jan van der; Grygar, Mojmir (eds.), Structure of Texts and Semiotics of Culture. The Hague, Paris: Mouton, 1–28.
- Waldstein, Maxim 2008. The Soviet Empire of Signs: A History of the Tartu School of Semiotics. Saarbrüchen: VDM Verlag.
- Winner, Thomas 1968. Introduction. In: I. M. Lotman, Lektsii po struktural'noi poetike. Vvedenie, teoriia stikha. Providence, Rhode Island: Brown University Press, vii-xii.
- Żyłko, Bogusław 2001. Culture and Semiotics: Notes on Lotman's Conception of Culture. New Literary History 32(2): 391–408.
- Żyłko, Bogusław 2014. Notes on Yuri Lotman's structuralism. International Journal of Cultural Studies: 1–16.
- Ekaterina Velmezova, ed. (2015). L'École sémiotique de Moscou-Tartu / Tartu-Moscou : Histoire. Épistémologie. Actualité. Vol. 40 (Slavica Occitania ed.). Toulouse: Université de Toulouse-Le Mirail. ISBN 978-2-9538558-9-0. Archived from the original on 2015-10-05.
