= Structuralism (disambiguation) =

Structuralism is a 1949 approach to anthropology and the human sciences in general, derived from linguistics, that attempts to analyze a specific field as a complex system of interrelated parts.

Structuralism may also refer to:

- Structuralism (architecture), movement in architecture and urban planning in the middle of the 20th century
- Structuralism (biology), school of biological thought that deals with the law-like behaviour of the structure of organisms
- Structuralism (international relations), studies the impact of world economic structures on the politics of countries
- Structuralism (linguistics), a 1916 theory that a human language is self-contained structure related to other elements which make up its existence
- Structuralism (philosophy of mathematics), theory of mathematics as structure
- Structuralism (philosophy of science), theory of science, reconstructing empirical theories
- Structuralism (psychology), a 1879 theory with the goal to describe the structure of the mind
- Structuralism (sociology), also known as structural functionalism
- Structural Marxism, a 1960s approach to Marxist philosophy based on structuralism
- Structural anthropology, a 1949 theory of fundamental components in all cultures, stories and rituals, a so-called "deep grammar"
- Structural film, an experimental film movement prominent in the US in the 1960s and which developed into the Structural/materialist films in the UK in the 1970s

== Books about Structuralism ==
- Structuralism in Literature (1974) by Robert Scholes
