= Anna Haava =

Estonian poet and translator (1864–1957)

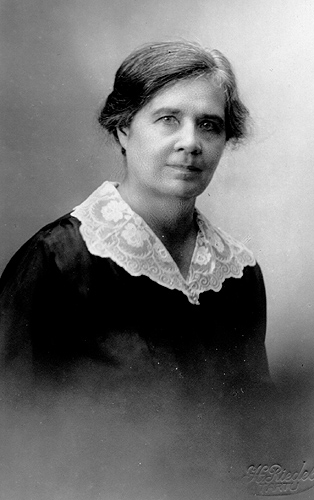
- Haava in the 1920s
- Born: Anna Rosalie Haavakivi; 15 October 1864; Pala municipality, Governorate of Livonia, Russian Empire
- Died: 13 March 1957 (aged 92); Tartu, then part of Estonian SSR, Soviet Union
- Other name: Anna Rosalie Espenstein
- Honours: 3rd Class of the Order of the Cross of the Eagle, 1930; 2nd Class Order of the Estonian Red Cross, 1935; People's Writer of the Estonian SSR, 1954; Order of the Badge of Honour

Anna Haava (born Anna Rosalie Haavakivi; 15 October 1864 – 13 March 1957) was an Estonian poet, writer and translator in the late 19th and 20th centuries. She was one of the founding members of the Estonian Writers' Union in 1922. She was honoured with the 3rd Class of the Order of the Cross of the Eagle, 1930; 2nd Class Order of the Estonian Red Cross, 1935; People's Writer of the Estonian SSR, 1954; and the Order of the Badge of Honour.

== Biography ==
Anna Rosalie Haavakivi was born 15 October 1864 in rural Kodavere Parish, which is now part of Peipsiääre Parish, in eastern Estonia. Haava's father, Joosep Haavakivi (1836–1891) married Sohvi Janast from the village of Punikvere, Estonia in 1860. In the peasant family from the Haavakivi mill-farm, Anna was raised with her older sister, Elisabet (1860–1893), and a younger brother, Rudolf (1870s–1950). It's said that as her father played the violin, Anna would sing along; her musicality would later influence her poetry and writings greatly.

In 1873 Anna Haavakivi began her formal education, attending schools in Pataste and Saare-Vanamõisa and Hoffmann's German-language private school in Tartu, Estonia from 1880 to 1884. From the German-language Tartu Higher Girls' School, she graduated with a home teacher diploma, which, at that time, was the only higher education available to Estonian women. Haava began working as a kindergarten teacher in Tartu.

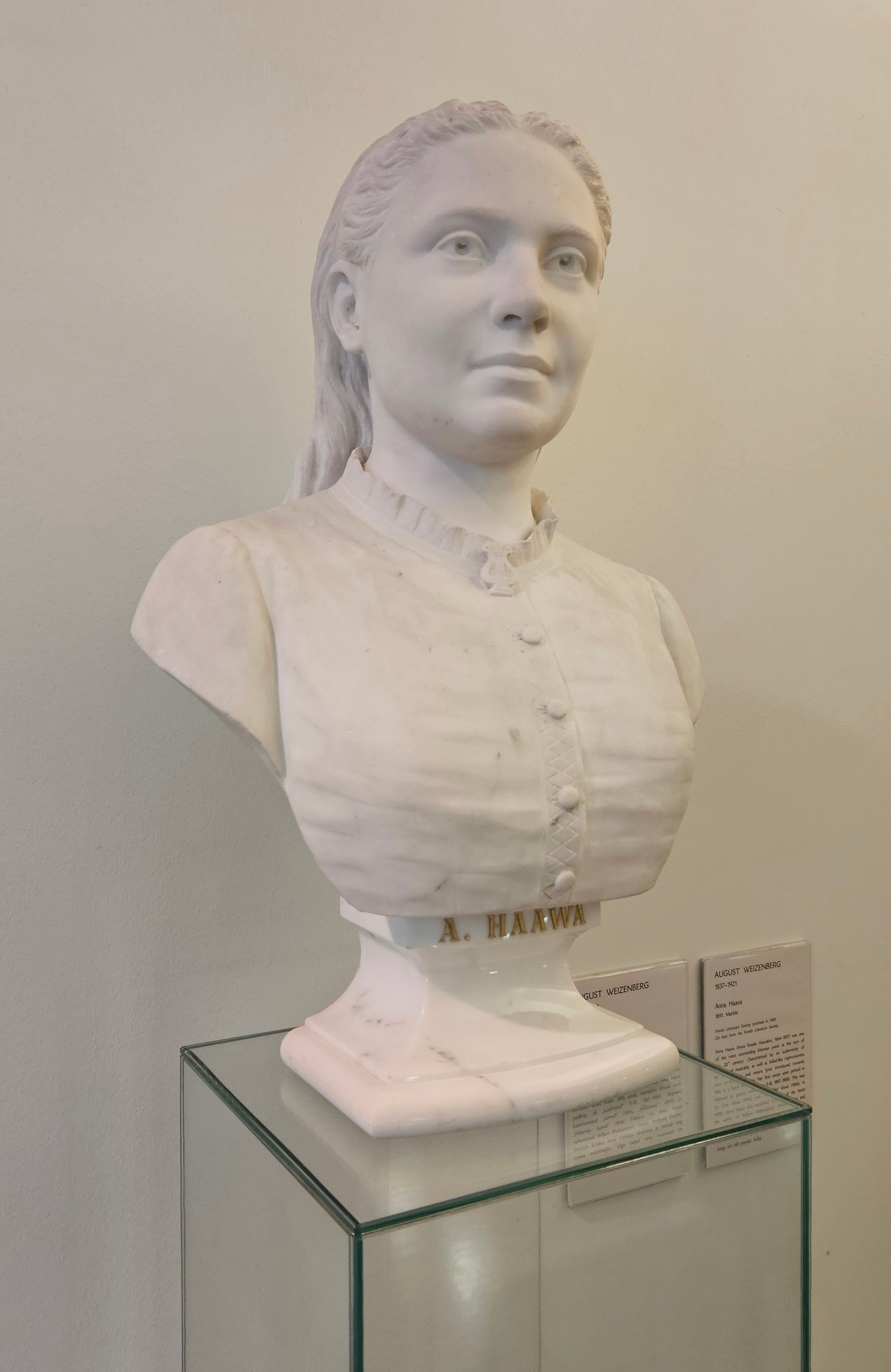
Replica of a 1889 bust of Haava by August Weizenberg

Haava's fluency with languages helped her throughout her life because the history of Estonia included, in turn, periods of Tsarist-Russian influence, new national independence, occupation by German forces during World War II, and annexation into the USSR by Soviet Russia.

While Haava attended the German-language school, she was given a "more German-sounding" name, Anna Rosalie Espenstein, and taught how to be a good German. But, on graduation, Anna insisted on restoring her birth name, Haavakivi, and resuming her life as a patriotic Estonian. (Although Anna today is widely remembered with the surname Haava, that did not become her official name until 1939.)

=== Writings ===
Anna Haava was an active poet her entire adult life, from the age of 22 well into old age. She published her first poem in the newspaper Postimees after the notable Estonian poet Lydia Koidula died in the summer of 1886. Her tribute was titled To Koidula and was signed by "An Estonian Girl". This work would become only the first of many Haava poems to appear in print.

Haava's first three collections, Luuletused I (Poems I) (1888), II (1890) and III (1897) contain romantic sentimental songs, the main theme of which is love. On publication, Haava's youthful poems got a warm public reception with all three volumes reprinted several times.

Haava published stories in journals, made a collection of aphorisms, Peotäis tõtt (A Handful of Truth, 1900). She also wrote prose describing her childhood home in the book titled Väikesed pildid Eestist (Little Pictures of Estonia, 1911).

Beginning in 1906, she began releasing collections of works exhibiting a less joyful tone, starting with Lained (Waves). Haava wrote to condemn injustice, violence and ethnic discrimination, and her criticism only deepened in some poetry collections, Ristlained (Crosswaves, 1910) and Meie päevist (From Our Days, 1920). Haava's poetry became even more personal in the collections Põhjamaa lapsed (Children of the Nordic Countries, 1913), Siiski on elu ilus (Still, Life is Beautiful), and Laulan oma eesti laulu (I Sing My Estonian Song, 1935). Her last original collection of poems appeared in 1954.

Haava was one of the founding members of the Estonian Writers' Union in 1922.

In 2006, the long-unpublished manuscript Mälestusi Laanekivi Manni lapsepõlvest (Memories of Laanekivi Mann's Childhood) appeared, followed in 2008 by Luule (Poems), a comprehensive volume containing some 700 of her poems.

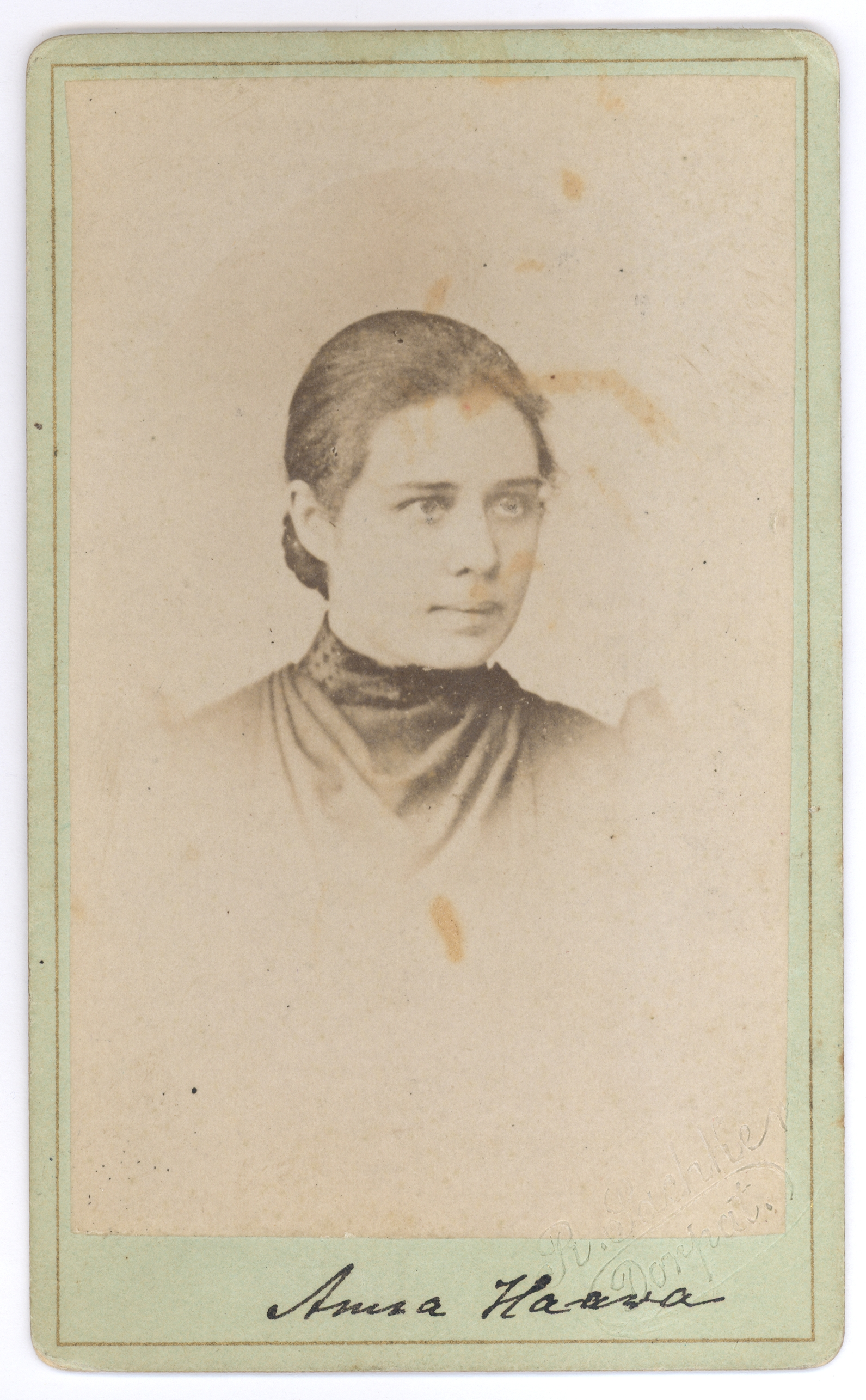
Haava, ca. 1885.

=== Musicality ===
I can't live without songs:

If I fall silent suddenly, - A

world without songs will become cramped,

Heart beat will break.

--Anna Haava (Translation by B. Kozhun)

Haava infused many of her poems with a remarkable musicality that facilitated their adaptation as lyrics for music composed by then-contemporary artists. As early as 1887, Miina Härma, a young organist studying in St. Petersburg, set her first songs to Haava's poems and more than 200 of Haava's poems have since been set to music by other composers. Some Haava-inspired songs went on to become familiar at regional festivals or transformed into folksy songs.

Haava also wrote the libretto to Artur Lemba's opera Lembitu tütar (Lembitu's Daughter) in 1908.

Her work still appears in print. In 2006, a German musical score was published, Kolm eesti laulu Anna Haava sõndele (1937–1940) = Drei Lieder für eine Singstimme mit Klavierbegleitung nach Gedichten von Anna Haava (Three songs for one voice with piano accompaniment based on poems by Anna Haava), and its authors are listed as, Gregor Heuer and Anna Haava.

=== Translations ===
As a translator, Haava was able to earn income by making important foreign language literature available to Estonian readers, including J.W. Goethe's Egmont, F. Schiller's Wilhelm Tell, H. Hofmannstahl's King Oedipus, W. Shakespeare's A Midsummer Night's Dream and Hans Christian Andersen's fairy tales, among others. Haava also translated some ancient mythology such as I. C. Andrä's and R. Schneider's Greeka muinaskangelased (Ancient Greek Heroes) and G. Schalk's Rooma muinaskangelased (Ancient Roman Heroes).

Her own poems were widely translated, including Russian, Finnish, Swedish, Hungarian, German, Italian, Esperanto, English and other languages as well.

== Difficulties ==
As a young woman, Anna started singing in a folk choir and fell in love with a student of the theological faculty of the University of Tartu. but she was only 25 when, one after another, both of her parents and the young student died. Two years later, her only sister, Liisa, passed on as well.

Her personal life in pieces, she traveled to Leipzig, Germany for her health, and then moved for several years to St. Petersburg, Russia where she became a nurse and teacher. In 1906, Haava returned to Estonia to live in Tartu where, for a while before the World War I, she joined the editorial team of Postimees. Later she worked as a freelance writer and translator.

Haava never had much income. Beginning in 1920 she qualified to receive a writer's pension, and in 1945 she was granted a personal pension.

== Final years ==
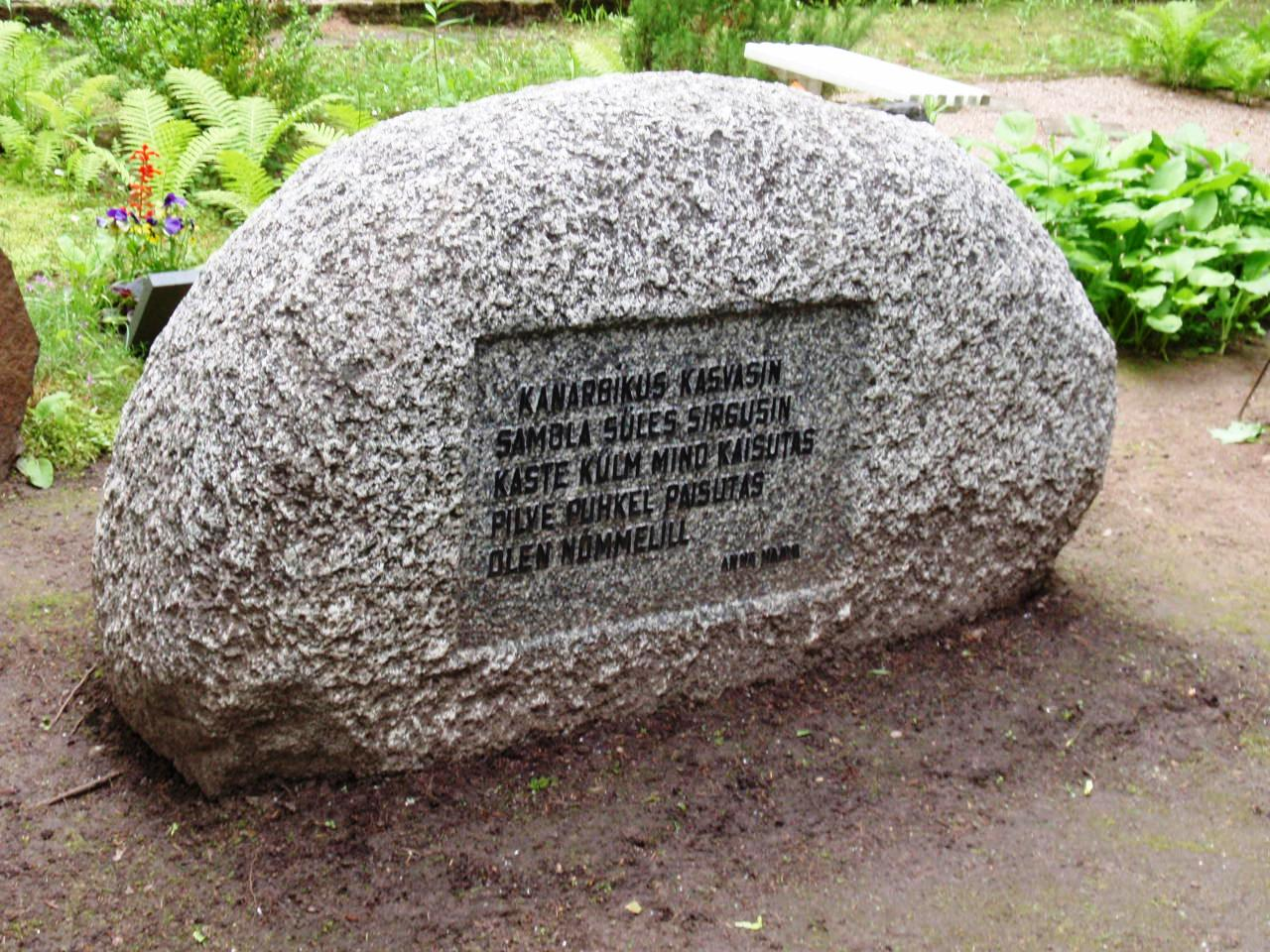
Grave site memorial to Anna Haava

In 1954, the city of Tartu held a celebration for the poet's 90th birthday in the University of Tartu's ceremonial hall. As part of that occasion, the city also named a street after her.

Anna Haava died in Tartu at the age of 92 on 13 March 1957 and was buried in the Maarja cemetery section of Raadi cemetery there. A stone bearing one of her poems marks the grave site.

In 2006, the Anna Haava Memorial Room was opened in Assikvere Community Center in Jõgeva County, Estonia.

== Distinctions ==
- 3rd Class of the Order of the Cross of the Eagle, 1930
- 2nd Class Order of the Estonian Red Cross, 1935
- People's Writer of the Estonian SSR, 1954
- Order of the Badge of Honour

== Selected works ==
Some collections.

- Poems I (Luuletused I) 1888
- Poems II (Luuletused II) 1890
- Poems III (Luuletused III) 1897
- Waves (Lained) 1906
- With a Sword and a Cross (Ristlained) 1910
- Children of the Nordic Countries (Põhjamaa lapsed) 1913
- From Our Days (Meie päevist) 1920
- Still, Life is Good (Siiski on elu ilus) 1930
- I Sing an Estonian Song (Laulan oma eestilaulu) 1935
