= Literary space =

Literary space refers to the model of the world presented in a literary work.

== Approaches to literary space ==
=== The past approach ===
Space in the 20th century was regarded as a part of various literary spheres, such as the narrative situation. It changed only in the last decade of the period. Since then literary space has been treated as an independent and unique entity, semantic centre of the work, while such notions as the time of action or characters became its particularizations.

=== The modern approaches ===
==== Juri Lotman ====
The first person to approach the issue of literary space from the semiotic point of view was Juri Lotman. According to Lotman, artistic space is only a model of real space, not its copy. He argued that the information provided by the text about space is incomplete and, consequently, space also is not complete. Being discontinuous (what is not mentioned in the text does not exist), space cannot be reconstructed by the implied reader (Lotman 1977, ''Przestrzeń artystyczna w prozie Gogola'', p. 213).

What is more, Lotman broached in his literary studies the question of the relationship between space in the text and space of the real world. He claimed both space organisations are governed by cultural stereotypes and conventions, which serve as kind of a 'mediator' between them. However, while additional senses are imposed on textual space by cultural codes, extratextual space uses the reworked ones. Through textual hints (described customs, clothing, etc.) literary space can refer to more general knowledge of the implied reader of the empirical reality. The aim of this measure is to make possible the association of the fictional world with the experiential one not calling it as if ''by name”.

Utilizing extratextual patterns, the author of a literary work creates their own vision of the world and they do it through the use of description. Limited just like description, such an authorial model does not exist beyond the textual frames and is composed of relations resulting from senses imposed on space. Those, in turn, may suggest non-spatial meanings (e.g. up is better, down is worse as in the case of a social hierarchy of H.G. Wells' The Time Machine and the Morlocks and the Eloi):

Literary space represents an author's model of the world, expressed in the language of spatial representation. In a literary work, space models different relations of the world-picture: temporary, social, ethical and others. […] in the literary models of the world―space sometimes metaphorically adopts meanings of relations in the modelled world-structure, that are themselves not spatial at all.

==== Janusz Sławiński ====
Janusz Sławiński considered the presented reality to be the most fundamental code modelling space, understood as the principles organising the thematic-compositional plane of a single literary work. This reality is the construction of words, the result of all the linguistic as well as stylistic choices which are made by the implied author, and as such, does not exist beyond the text. It is vital not only to imagine space but also to follow the narration, the description, and the course of action, since all those may shape the fictitious reality by imposing the additional meanings on it.

Literary/cultural conventions constitute the second space-modelling code. This system is more abstract one than the previous one. It does not refer to how an individual work shapes space but how it is conventionally done by a given epoch, genre, etc. So, for instance, one of the main features of Gothic novels are elements of the supernatural and the sublime, therefore, texts are full of ghosts, vampires and so on.

Language is the last of codes shaping space. Every language models space in a different manner. The language of geography, for example, differentiates cardinal and intercardinal directions, among others, west or north-east, while geometry uses relative directions, for instance, left/right/backward(s)/forward(s). In short, it can be said that language organises space in a way, defines it, and provides terms for various types of spatial arrangements.

Finally, Sławiński put an emphasis on description, scenery and superimposed senses, three interrelated planes influencing space (Sławiński 2000, p. 205)

The descriptive plane is the aspect of narration and consists of words. It is especially crucial to space when it is introduced to the implied reader. The spatial relationship would be impossible to define without description. It describes space directly or implies it, developing together with characters' movements. This 'development' makes the description a dynamic notion in a sense that it creates meanings. Certain elements of the description relate to each other not only on the grammatical but also semantic level. For example, there are relations between words and phrases. Added-on meanings imposed on particular fragments of a text are, for instance, the consequence of such relations.

Contrary to description, scenery is considered to be a static entity as it results from description. Description producing scenery may consist of a single block of text or scenery can be the effect of numerous descriptive references in such a text put together.

Superimposed senses are the last plane. They are a structure caring added-on meanings. They are not conditioned in any way and are type of a subcode which shapes non-spatial relationships and values (Sławiński 2000, p. 212).

==== Mieczysław Porębski ====
According to Mieczysław Porębski space can be divided into three types, namely, extratextual, intertextual and intratextual. The first is where works of art are stored. It is physical, 3-dimensional and, therefore, can be experienced by readers (e.g. libraries). The second type is space only in a metaphorical sense, a set of conventions, of common fields of references for a certain piece of writing. It may refer either to other texts or literary traditions (just like J.R.R. Tolkien's The Hobbit by the appearance of dwarves alludes to, for instance, fairy tales), or both, and as such, intertextual space is an abstract notion. The last space differentiated by Porębski is, intratextual space, is what can be called 'an intentional space' since it is implied and, provoked by the text itself, exists only in the implied reader's imagination.

Porębski derived three subspaces from the intratextual space: physical, symbolical and mathematical ones. The physical space is considered to be an intricate structure, not ordered. What is more, it is 3-dimensional to characters and infinite (lines of length, etc. can be prolonged as much as one wishes them to). The symbolical type of space is the way in which culture arranges it. It is the most primary type of spatial organisation, and it is so crucial due to its metaphysical and eschatological dimension but only when some additional meanings are endows otherwise semantically neutral space. The mathematical type of space can be divided further into topological and geometrical spaces. The former shows how space is perceived in both cultural and mythological way, having much in common with a symbolical space, the latter uses map features, e.g. distances, symmetries, proportions, etc.
