= Tõnu Viik =

Tõnu Viik may refer to:

- Tõnu Viik (astronomer) (born 1939), Estonian astronomer
- Tõnu Viik (philosopher) (born 1968), Estonian philosopher
