= Stanislav Netšvolodov =

Estonian sculptor (born 1935)

Stanislav Nešvolodov
- Born: August 2, 1935 (age 90); Kyiv, Ukrainian SSR, USSR
- Occupation: Sculptor

Stanislav Netšvolodov (also Netchvolodov, born August 2, 1935, in Kyiv) is an Estonian sculptor and medal artist. He is a professor at Jagiellonian University.

Stanislav Netšvolodov has created bronze, wood, and stone sculptures and monuments. He is also involved with painting and graphics. Netšvolodov's hobby is medal art, and he has created several medals for the University of Tartu (including the university's honorary doctorate medal and the Johan Skytte medal).

== Education ==
Netšvolodov graduated from the Kyiv Civil Engineering Institute in 1959 with a degree in architecture.

== Career ==
Netšvolodov started creating sculptures in 1962, and he worked at a private sculpture studio in Irkutsk. From 1966 to 1970, he was the chairman of the Irkutsk branch of the Russian Union of Architects. He then worked as an artist at the Ars foundation in Tartu and as a restorer of church interiors in Poland. He has also worked as a sculpture lecturer at several art schools.

Netšvolodov is a member of the Tartu Artists Union and the Metal Artists Union (Estonian: Eesti Metallikunstnike Liit).

== Works ==
- Plaster bas-relief of Friedrich Puksoo (1990), located on the 3rd floor of the University of Tartu library building in the Puksoo Gallery
- Bronze figure of a boy with a dog on the grave of Peeter Ott
- Bronze cross on the grave of Juri Lotman and Zara Mints
- Juri Lotman's bas-relief on the wall of the university building on Lossi tänav (Castle Street) in Tartu
- Bronze bust of Juri Lotman in the study building of the Faculty of Philosophy of the University of Tartu, Jakobi tänav (James Street)
- Memorial column on the grave of the Auli family in Raadi cemetery in Tartu (1994); bronze and granite

== Awards ==
- 2002: Anton Starkopf Fellowship
