= Raadi cemetery =

Cemetery in Tartu, Estonia

Coordinates: 58°23′40″N 26°43′40″E

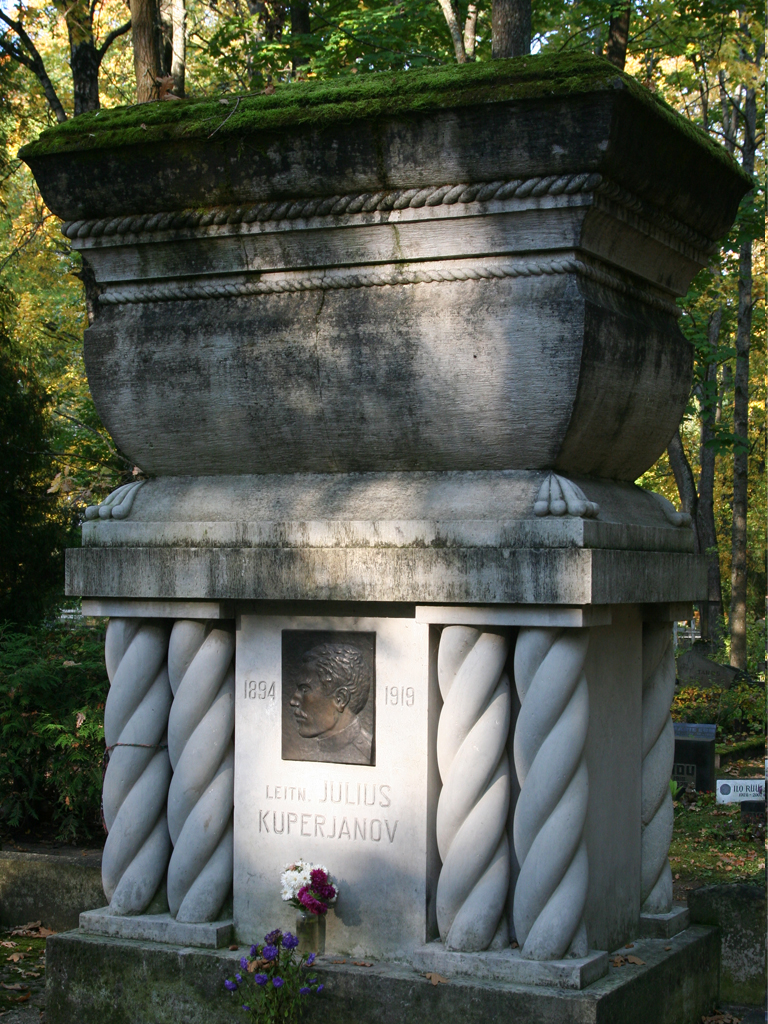
The Julius Kuperjanov monument

Raadi cemetery, (Estonian: Raadi kalmistu) is the oldest and largest burial ground in Tartu, Estonia, dating back to 1773. Many prominent historical figures are buried there. It is also the largest Baltic German cemetery in Estonia after the destruction of Kopli cemetery in Tallinn. Until 1841, it was the only cemetery in the town.

The cemetery currently includes several smaller graveyard sections, the oldest of which date back to 1773.

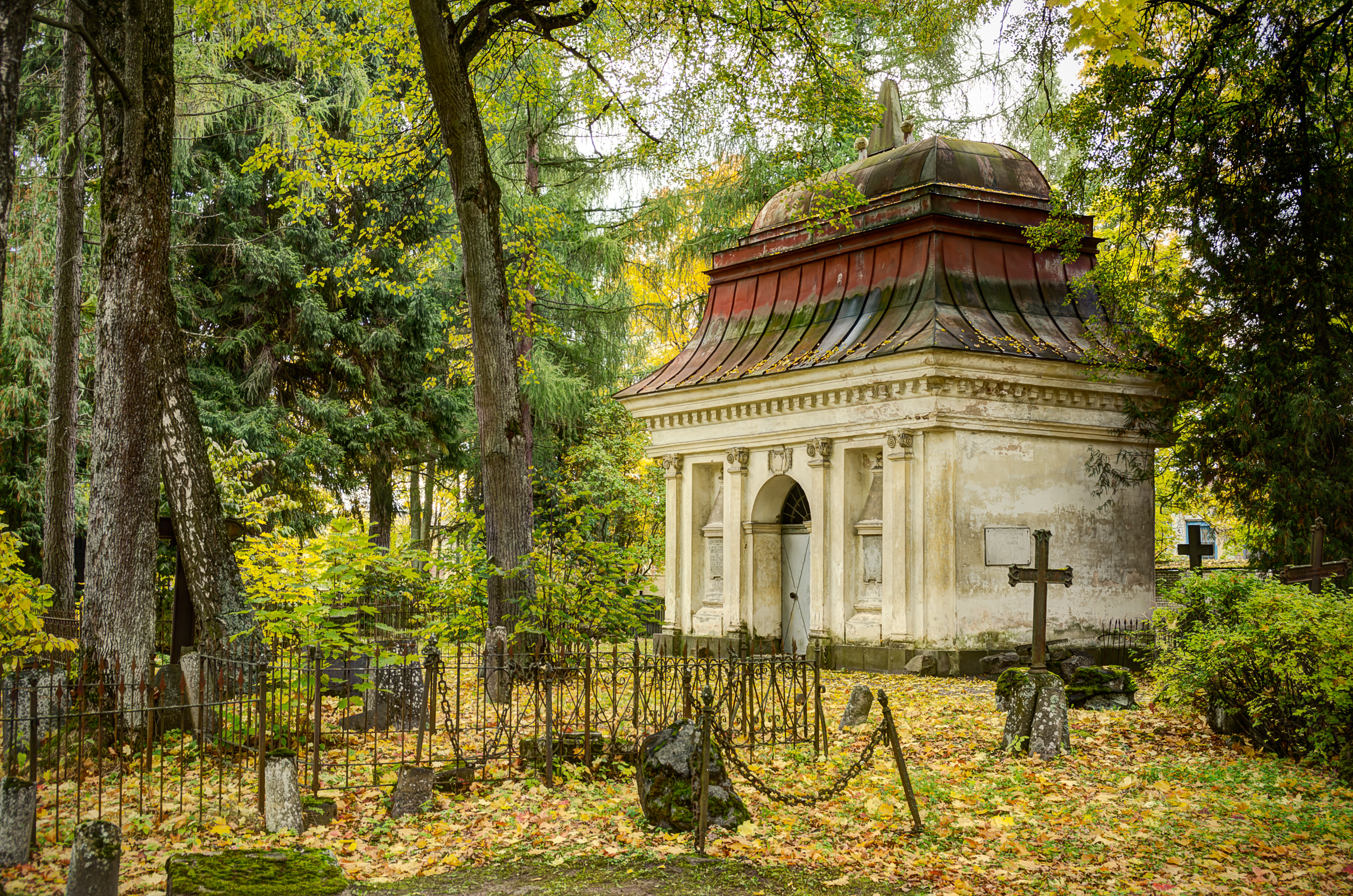
Teller Chapel, 1794

== Origins, 1771–1773 ==
Between 1771 and 1772, Russian empress Catherine the Great, issued an edict which decreed that from that point on no-one who died (regardless of their social standing or class origins) was to be buried in a church crypt or churchyard; all burials were to take place in the new cemeteries to be built throughout the entire Russian empire, which were to be located outside town boundaries.

These measures were intended to overcome the congestion of urban church crypts and graveyards, and were prompted by a number of outbreaks of highly contagious diseases linked to inadequate burial practices in urban areas, especially the black plague which had led to the Plague Riot in Moscow in 1771.

The burial ground was officially opened on 5 November 1773 as the St. John's (town) parish cemetery. It also served as the University of Tartu's burial ground. The St. Mary's (country) parish and Russian Orthodox Dormition congregation cemeteries were established north-west of the St. John's in the same year. It served as the only cemetery in the town until 1841.

== Decline in burials, 1939–1944 ==
Burials at the cemetery were drastically reduced after the transfer of Baltic German population over to western Poland in late 1939. Burials at the cemetery continued on a much smaller scale until 1944, principally among those Baltic Germans who had refused Hitler's call to leave the region.

== Present state ==
By the beginning of the 21st century, the expansion of the town has passed beyond the borders of the cemetery and alternative burial grounds are established elsewhere in the town. A Pseudotsuga parkway located at the cemetery is under protection.

== Notable interments ==
- Franz Ulrich Theodor Aepinus (1724–1802), physicist
- Betti Alver (1906–1989), poet
- Paul Ariste (1905–1990), linguist
- Kalev Arro (1915–1974), Forest Brother partisan
- Lauri Aus (1970–2003), cyclist
- Karl Ernst von Baer (1792–1876), biologist
- Friedrich Bidder (1810–1894), physiologist
- Alexander Bunge (1803–1890), botanist
- Karl Ernst Claus (1796–1864), chemist and naturalist
- Karl Gottfried Konstantin Dehio (1851–1927), internist
- Jaan Eilart (1933–2006), phytogeographer and conservationist
- Villem Ernits (1891–1982) linguist, philologist, politician.
- Friedrich Robert Faehlmann (1798–1850), philologist
- Anna Haava (1864–1957), poet and translator
- Miina Härma (1864–1941), composer
- Gregor von Helmersen (1803–1885), geologist
- Samuel Gottlieb Rudolph Henzi (1794–1829), orientalist and theologist
- Johann Voldemar Jannsen (1819–1890), journalist and poet
- Harald Keres (1912–2010), physicist
- Amalie Konsa (1873–1949), actress
- Friedrich Reinhold Kreutzwald (1803–1882), writer
- Olevi Kull (1955–2007), ecologist
- Eerik Kumari (1912–1984), naturalist and conservationist
- Julius Kuperjanov (1894–1919), military commander
- Raine Loo (1945–2020), actress
- Oskar Loorits (1900–1961), folklorist
- Juri Lotman (1922–1993), semiotician and culturologist
- Juhan Luiga (1873–1927), psychiatrist, physician, author, publicist and politician
- Leonhard Merzin (1934–1990), actor
- Otto Wilhelm Masing (1763–1832), writer
- Uku Masing (1909–1985), philosopher and folklorist
- Viktor Masing (1925–2001), ecologist
- Zara Mints (1927–1990), literary scientist
- Friedrich Parrot (1791–1841), naturalist and traveller
- Ludvig Puusepp (1875–1942), surgeon
- Edmund Russow (1841–1897), biologist
- August Sabbe (1909–1978), Forest Brother
- Hermann Guido von Samson-Himmelstjerna (1809–1868), physician
- Carl Schmidt (1822–1894), chemist
- Gustav Teichmüller (1832–1888), philosopher
- Hugo Treffner (1845–1912), pedagogue
- Mihkel Veske (1843–1890), poet and linguist

== See also ==
- List of cemeteries in Estonia
- Nazi-Soviet population transfers
- Baltic Germans
