= Rakett69 season 2 =

Season of Estonian television series

This article contains contestant information and episode summaries from Season 2 of the Estonian competitive science television series Rakett69. Season 1 aired starting on January 14, 2012 and concluded on April 21, 2012.

The show was divided into 16 episodes, each about 27 minutes long. Parallel to the TV show, an internet show also aired on The official homepage

== Contestants ==
The 15 contestants, who got through the talent show, were initially divided into the Green team, the Orange team and the Blue team.

Contestant	School	Initial team
Aleksander Vdovets	Maardu Gümnaasium, Grade 10	Orange
Riinu Ansper	Tartu University, Chemistry, 1st year	Orange
Andreas Ragen Ayal	Tartu University, Physics, 1st year	Blue
Kristjan Kalve	Hugo Treffner Gymnasium, Grade 10	Blue
Siim Kurvits	Hugo Treffner Gymnasium, Grade 10	Green
Erki Lomp	Miina Härma Gymnasium, Grade 11	Blue
Ann Leen Mahhov	Tallinna Reaalkool, Grade 10	Green
Ove Liis Mahhov	Tallinna Reaalkool, Grade 12	Orange
Mats Mikkor	Viljandi Carl Robert Jakobsoni-nimeline gümnaasium, Grade 12	Orange
Madis Ollikainen	Tartu University, Physics, 1st year	Blue
Reet Rosar	Tapa Gümnaasium, Grade 12	Green
Taavi Simson	Tallinn University of Technology, Material Technology, 3rd year	Blue
Simo Jarek Zaranen	Taru Kivilinna Gümnaasium, Grade 12	Green
Timothy Henry Charles Tamm	Gustav Adolf Grammar School, Grade 10	Green
Kristiina Tüür	Tartu University, Biology, 3rd year	Orange

== Episodes ==
Each episode consisted of three challenges, one contestant had to leave each episode.

=== Episode 1 ===
- Theme: Talent show
- Original airdate: January 7.
- Challenge: In the first episode, 30 contestants had to impress the judges with a short presentation. Most of the presentations were either physical or chemical experiments. 15 contestants were chosen to compete in the first season.

=== Episode 2 ===
- Theme: History
- Original airdate: January 14.
- Challenges: The contestants were divided into three teams with the help of robot Oskar.

The first challenge was to measure the distance of a hammer without stepping away from the table.

The second challenge was to light a candle using the various given materials.

The third challenge was to purify a cup of contaminated water.

- Result: The Blue team lost and Kristjan was sent home.
