= Franz Aepinus =

German mathematician (1724–1802)

- Born: 13 December 1724; Rostock, Duchy of Mecklenburg-Schwerin, Holy Roman Empire
- Died: 10 August 1802 (aged 77); Dorpat, Livonia, Russian Empire
- Scientific career
- Fields: electricity and magnetism, astronomy

Franz Ulrich Theodor Aepinus (13 December 1724 – 10 August 1802) was a German mathematician, scientist, and natural philosopher residing in the Russian Empire. Aepinus is best known for his researches, theoretical and experimental, in electricity and magnetism.

== Early life ==
He was born at Rostock in the Duchy of Mecklenburg-Schwerin. He was descended from Johannes Aepinus (1499–1553), the first to adopt the Greek form (αἰπεινός) of the family name Hugk or Huck, and a leading theologian and controversialist at the time of the Protestant Reformation.

== Career ==
After studying medicine for a time, Franz Aepinus devoted himself to the physical and mathematical sciences, in which he soon gained such distinction that he was admitted a member of the Prussian Academy of Sciences. In 1755, he was briefly the director of the Astronomisches Rechen-Institut. In 1757, he settled in St Petersburg as member of the Russian Academy of Sciences and professor of physics, and remained there till his retirement in 1798.

The rest of his life was spent at Dorpat. He enjoyed the favor of Empress Catherine II of Russia, who appointed him tutor to her son Paul, and endeavored, without success, to establish normal schools throughout the empire under his direction. In 1760, Aepinus was elected a foreign member of the Royal Swedish Academy of Sciences.

In 2009, Aepinus crater on the Moon was named in his honor.

== Works ==
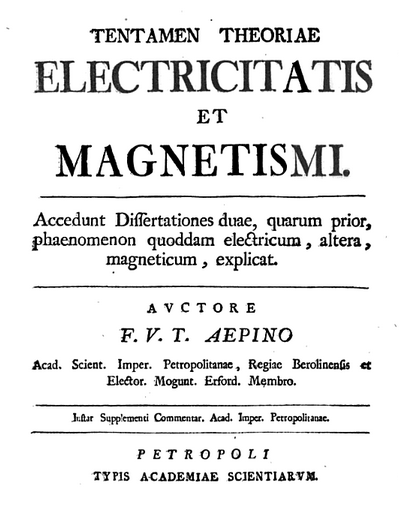
Title page of his 1759 book

His principal work, Tentamen Theoriae Electricitatis et Magnetismi ("An Attempt at a Theory of Electricity and Magnetism"), published at St. Petersburg in 1759, was the first systematic attempt to apply mathematical reasoning to these subjects. He also published a treatise, in 1761, De Distributione Caloris per Tellurem (On the Distribution of Heat in the Earth), and he was the author of memoirs on different subjects in astronomy, mechanics, optics and pure mathematics, contained in the journals of the learned societies of St. Petersburg and Berlin.

His discussion of the effects of parallax in the transit of a planet over the sun's disc excited great interest, having appeared (in 1764) between the dates of the two transits of Venus that took place in the 18th century.

== Electrical theories ==
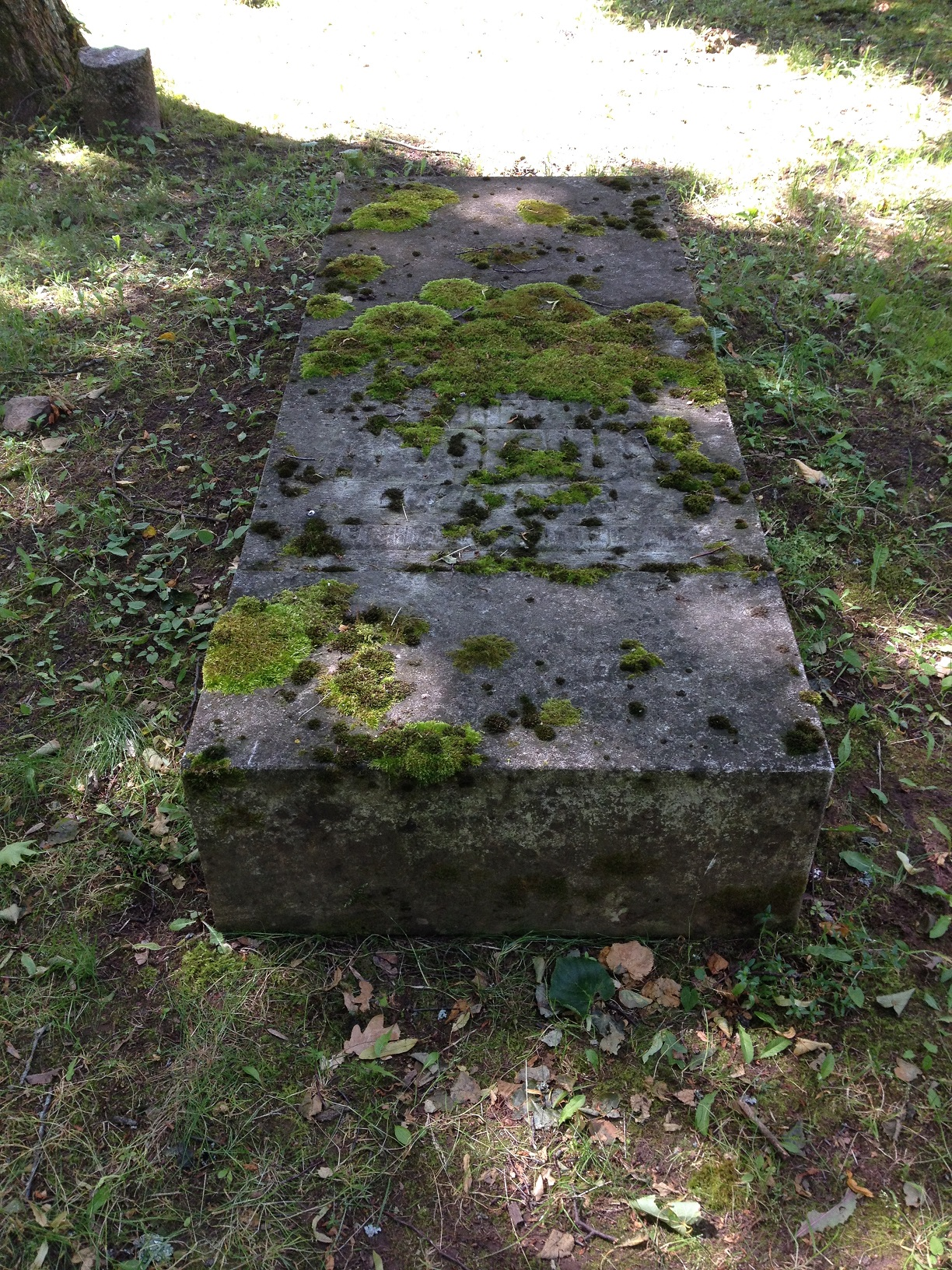
Aepinus gravestone in Raadi cemetery, Tartu, Estonia

Aepinus was the first to show that a theory of action at a distance for electricity provides simple explanation for experimental findings now known as electrostatic induction, laying the foundations for electrostatics His theory resembled Newton's approach to gravity in that it relied on unexplained action at a distance; also like Newton Aepinus believed that the transmission of force required contact. These seeming contradictions reflect the modern scientific concept of approximate models of physical phenomena.

Henry Cavendish devised theories of electricity which were essentially the same, yet had been framed without any communication between these two philosophers. Aepinus published his theory about ten years before that of Cavendish. These are theories which eventually put to rest the idea of two fluids.

== Sources ==
- "Эпинус, Франц-Ульрих-Теодор" . Brockhaus and Efron Encyclopedic Dictionary (in Russian). 1906.
