= Zara Mints =

Russian literary scientist

- Зара Григорьевна Минц
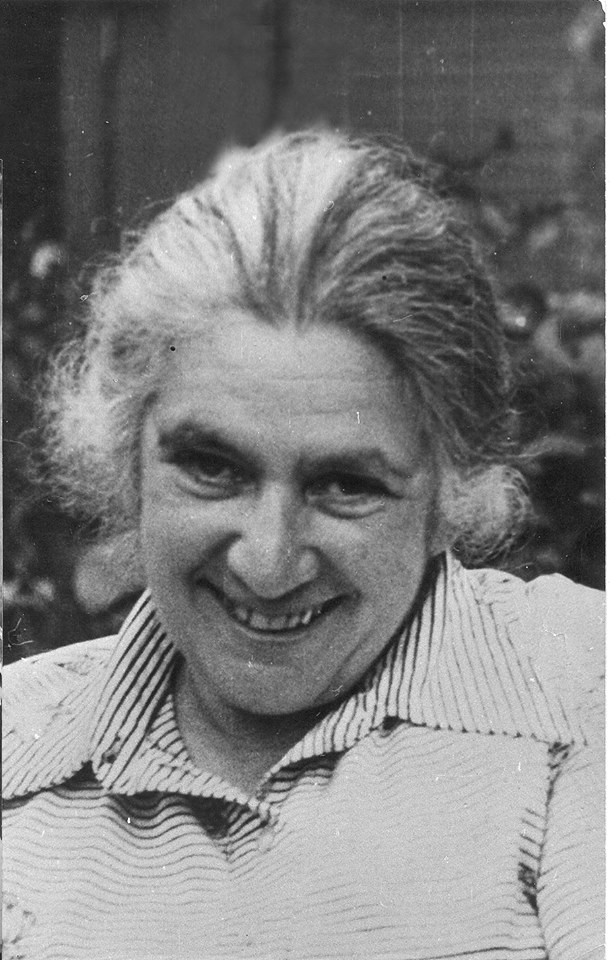
- Mints in 1989
- Born: July 24, 1927; Pskov, RSFSR
- Died: October 25, 1990 (aged 63); Bergamo, Italy
- Resting place: Raadi Cemetery, Tartu
- Education: Leningrad State University
- Known for: Linguist, literary scholar, university teacher, literary scholar
- Scientific career
- Fields: Literary criticism
- Workplaces: University of Tartu

Zara Grigoryevna Mints (Russian: Зара Григорьевна Минц; July 24, 1927 – October 25, 1990) was a Slavic literary scientist active in the University of Tartu. She was the wife of Juri Lotman.

Mints was born in Pskov, but the family soon moved to Leningrad. Her mother Frida Abramovna Sinderikhina (1889?–1939) was a stomatologist, father Girsh Yefremovich Mints was an administrator of Volgograd Sanitary Inspection facility.

She went to high school 1935–1941 in Leningrad, was evacuated to Yaroslavl Oblast and later to Chelyabinsk during World War II. She entered Leningrad University in 1944.

Already during her student years, she began to specialize in Aleksandr Blok's works. Although she graduated cum laude, she couldn't start the postgraduate studies due to the antisemitic campaign of the late 1940s and the beginning of the 1950s. Initially working as a Russian teacher, she went to Tartu with her husband (they had married in 1951), where she could start her career as a university lecturer. From 1955, she worked at the department of Russian literature. Mints became a professor in 1979.

On 21 November 1972 she defended her Doctor's thesis (Aleksandr Blok i russkaja realisticheskaja literatura XIX veka – Aleksandr Blok and Russian Realist Literature of the 19th Century), but the All-Union Higher Assessment Commission did not give her the degree until five years later. Mints' courses chiefly covered the Russian literature of the 19th century and the beginning of the 20th century (Dostoyevsky, Chekhov, Blok, e.g. connections between Blok's works and the general cultorological questions).

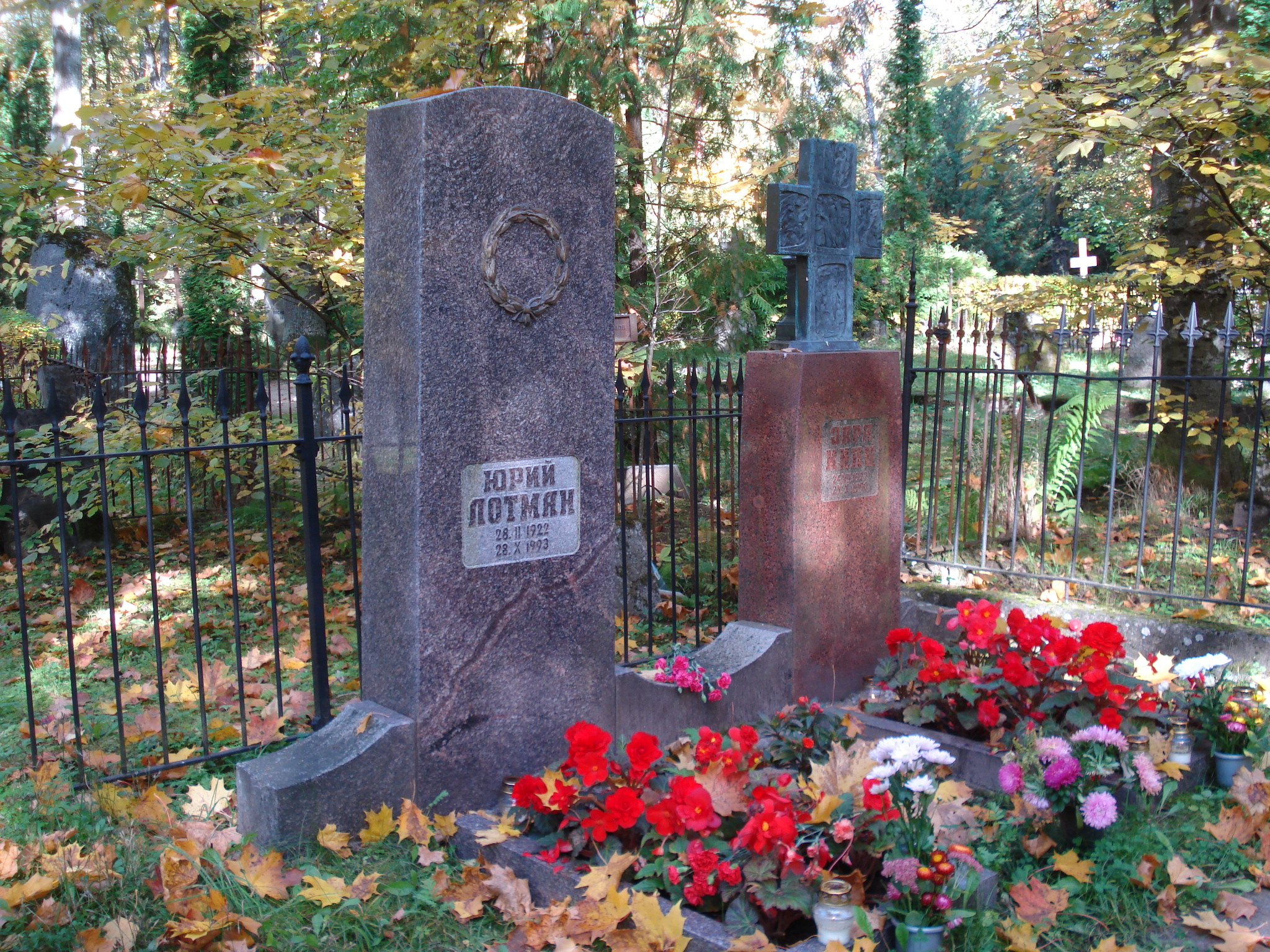
Yuri Lotman and Zara Minc [Mints] grave at Raadi cemetery in Tartu; bronze cross by Stanislav Netšvolodov

Mints took actively part in collecting Blok's literary heritage and publishing the monograph Aleksandr Blok: Novye materialy i issledovanija – A.B.: New Materials and studies, 5 Volumes, Moscow 1980–1987. In the late 1980s, Mints's health deteriorated sharply. In 1990, she underwent an operation in Bergamo, Italy that caused an unexpected complication, due to which she died. She was buried in Tartu at the Raadi cemetery.

== See also ==
- Juri Lotman
- Mihhail Lotman
- Aleksei Lotman

== Bibliography ==
- Лавров А. В. Александр Блок в трудах и днях З. Г. Минц // Минц З. Г. Блок и русский символизм: избранные труды: в трех книгах. [Т. 2], Александр Блок и русские писатели. Санкт-Петербург, 2000. С. 7–20.
