= Thomas G. Winner =

Thomas Gustav Winner (3 May 1917, Prague – 20 April 2004, Cambridge, Massachusetts) was an American slavist and semiotician.

At Brown University, together with Robert Scholes, he established the first American semiotics center.

He was a well-known Chekhov specialist, and a proponent of Tartu-Moscow semiotics school. He graduated from Harvard University (MA) and Columbia University (PhD).
