= Juhan Luiga =

Estonian politician (1873–1927)

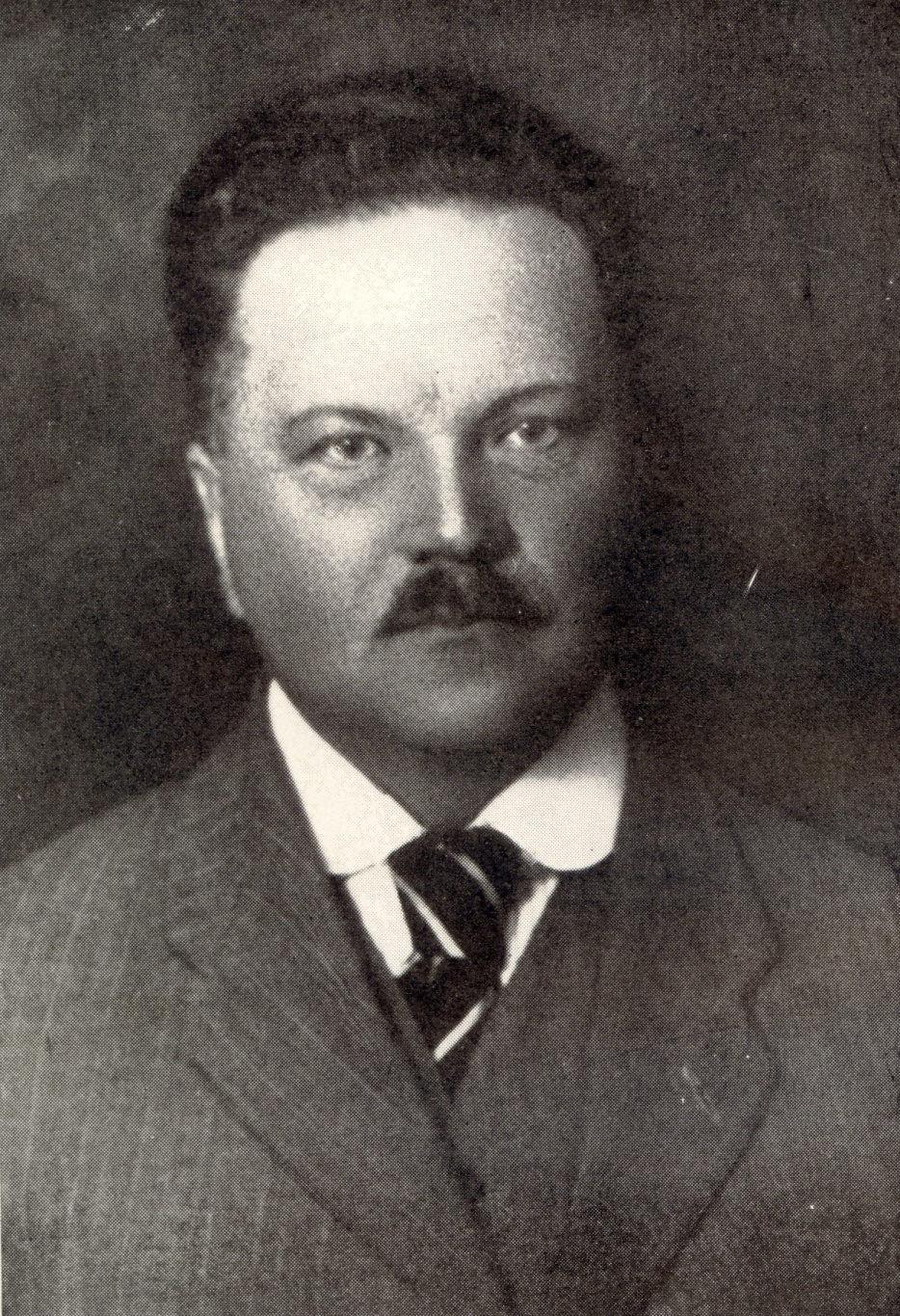
Juhan Luiga

Juhan Luiga (31 March 1873 – 19 October 1927) was an Estonian psychiatrist, physician, author, publicist, and politician. He was a member of I Riigikogu.

== Career ==
Juhan Luiga was born in Ropka in 1873. He attended primary and secondary schools in Tartu. In 1899, he graduated from the Faculty of Medicine of the University of Tartu. In 1904, he became one of the first Estonian psychiatrists, Doctor of Medicine. From 1899 until 1908, he worked as an assistant at the Nervous and Mental Diseases Clinic of the University of Tartu. From 1908 until 1927, he worked in private practice in Tallinn, as well as a school and city physician.

During World War I, he worked as a military doctor. From 1917–1918, he was in Finland, as the chief marshal of the liaison detachment of the Estonian division. In 1918, he was also the chief marshal in the Estonian Army for a period of several months. Luiga participated as a volunteer in the Estonian War of Independence as a military physician. In 1919 he was elected dean of the University of Tartu's Faculty of Medicine, but refused to accept the position.

Luiga was elected as a member of the first composition of the Riigikogu, representing the Estonian Labour Party. From 1921 until 1927, he was the chairman of the Union of Estonian Medical Associations. Luiga was also among the founders of magazine Eesti Arst and a founder of the Estonian Health Care Museum. During his career, he published writings on psychiatry, religious psychology of the Finno-Ugric peoples, ancient Estonian religion, Estonian history, and modern politics.

== Personal life and death ==
In 1913, Luiga married actress and stage director Erna Villmer. The couple had no children and divorced in 1923.

Juhan Luiga died of a stroke in Tallinn in 1927, aged 54, and was interred at Raadi cemetery in Tartu. His granite headstone was designed by artist Jaan Koort.
