= Aleksei Lotman =

Estonian biologist, environmentalist, and politician

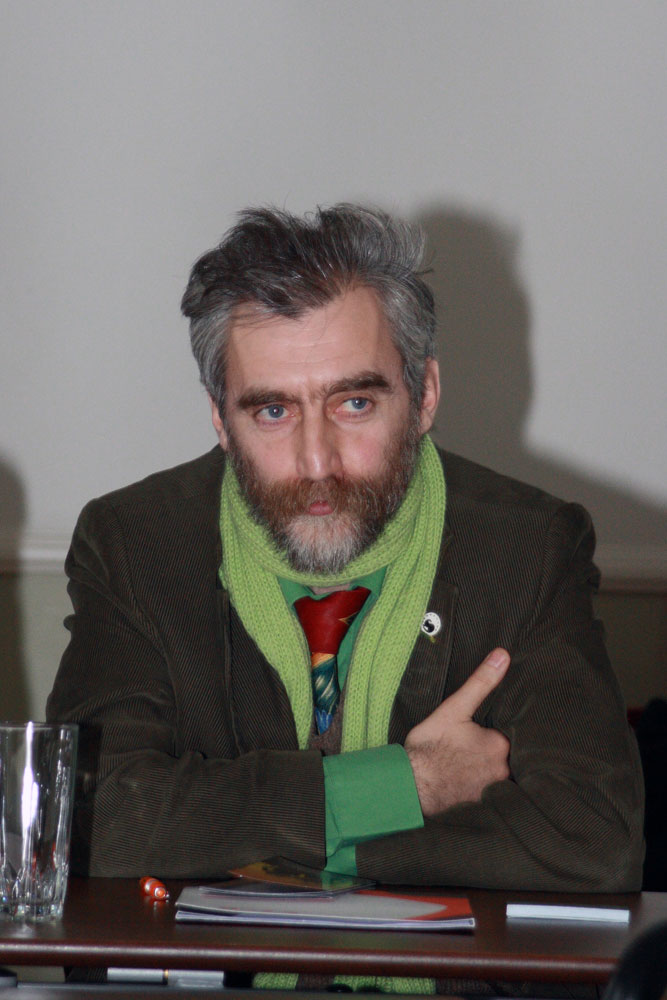
Aleksei Lotman in 2011

Aleksei Lotman (also known as Alex Lotman and Aleks Lotman; born 6 May 1960 in Leningrad) is an Estonian biologist, environmentalist and politician.

From 2010 to 2011 Lotman served as the leader of political party Estonian Greens. From 2007 to 2011, Lotman was a member of Estonian parliament Riigikogu, representing the Estonian Greens. He was also leader of the parliamentary group for Tibet. In the 2011 election, the Greens lost all their parliamentary representation.

Since then he has worked for the Estonian Fund for Nature.

He was awarded the Order of the National Coat of Arms, 5th Class, by the President of Estonia on 6 February 2006.

Aleksei Lotman graduated from the Tartu Miina Härma Secondary School No 2 in 1978, and the Tartu State University as a biologist in 1985.

1991–2000, Lotman served as the vice director of the Matsalu National Park.

== Personal life ==
Alex Lotman is the son of literary scholar, semiotician, and cultural historian Juri Lotman and literary scientist Zara Mints. His brothers are literature researcher and politician Mihhail Lotman and artist Grigori Lotman. Alex Lotman is married to environmentalist Kaja Lotman, they have two daughters and a son.
