= Indrek Simm =

Estonian film director

Indrek Simm (born 8 September 1973) is an Estonian film and television director.

He is working at film production company Eetriüksus OÜ.

== Filmography ==
- 1997 "Waba Riik" (television series; director)
- 2009 "Kummikaru" (documental film; director)
- 2010 "Pilvede all" (television series; director)
- 2011 "Rakett69" (television series; director)
- 2013 "Kartulid ja apelsinid" (television series; director)
- 2015 "Üheotsapilet" (television series; director)
- 2016 "Kellapid" (television series; director)
- 2018 "Lõks" (television series; director)
