= Rakett69 season 1 =

Season of Estonian television series

This article contains contestant information and episode summaries from Season 1 of the Estonian competitive science television series Rakett69. Season 1 aired starting on January 15, 2011 and concluded on May 7, 2011.

The show was divided into 16 episodes, each about 27 minutes long. Parallel to the TV show, 10 minute long internet show also aired on The official homepage

== Contestants ==
The 12 contestants, who got through the talent show, were initially divided into the White team, the Gray team and the Blue team.

Contestant	Age	School	Initial team
Sarah Aaspõllu	19	Tartu University, Geology 1st year	Gray
Madle Sirel	19	Tartu University Gene technology 1st year	White
Juhan Koppel	18	Pärnu Sütevaka Gümnaasium, grade 12	Blue
Eerik Martma	19	Tallinn University of Technology, Chemistry 1st year	Gray
Uku-Laur Tali	18	Hugo Treffneri Gümnaasium, grade 12	White
Erik Mänd	16	Nõo Reaalgümnaasium, grade 10	Gray
Henri Reeder	21	Tallinn University, History 1st year	Blue
Jaan-Eerik Past	18	Miina Härma Gümnaasium, grade 12	Blue
Kärt Üpraus	20	Tartu University, geology 2nd year	Blue
Sandhra-Mirella Valdma	19	Tartu University, Physics 1st year	Gray
Riinu Ots	20	Tartu University, Physics 2nd year	White
Mart Seger	19	Tallinna 37. Keskkool, grade 12	White

== Episodes ==
Each episode consisted of a 3 challenges and with 3 exceptions, a contestant had to leave each episode.

=== Episode 1 ===
- Theme: Talent show
- Original airdate: January 15.
- Challenge: In the first episode, contestants had to impress the judges with a short presentation. Most of the presentations were either physical or chemical experiments. 12 contestants were chosen to compete in the first season.

=== Episode 2 ===
- Original airdate: January 22.
- Challenges: The first challenge was to divide two numbers with the help of an abacus and a slider

The second challenge was to build a scale, to weigh exactly 15,6 kg of potatoes.

The third challenge was to build a clock, to measure exactly 1 minute.

- Result: The Blue team won, but no one was sent home.

=== Episode 3 ===
The Blue team started the third episode one man down, because Henri had to sing in a choir.

- Original airdate: January 29.
- Challenges: The first challenge was to break a balloon from a distance, using rubber and wire.

The second challenge was to measure the length of a wooden beam that was hanging from the ceiling, from a distance.

The third challenge was cutting a wooden beam. Two teams had to take turns in cutting the beam and the team, who got the last cut, won. each cut had to be 10 to 50 cm long.

- Result: The White team lost and Madle had to go home.

=== Episode 4 ===
- Theme: Water
- Original airdate: February 5.
- Challenges: The first challenge was to raise the water level in a cylinder, with holes drilled in it. The contestants had to cover the holes with their bodies and pour water inside.

The second challenge was to shine 4 coins (2 new ones and 2 old ones), so they look alike.

The third challenge was to extinguish candles from a distance, using only 100g of water.

- Result: Once again the White team lost and Mart had to go home.

=== Episode 5 ===
- Theme: Food

At the start of the episode, the White team were given a silent helper, because there were only 2 of them. The helper couldn't speak to the team, but he did what the team told him to do.

- Original airdate: February 12.
- Challenges: The first challenge was to align food products by their energy content.

The second challenge was to align cups of liquids, by their PH. They were given vinegar, baking soda and red cabbage, which is a natural pH indicator.

The third challenge was to align 4 cups of chili pepper powders, by their hotness.

- Result: The Gray team lost and Erik Mänd had to go home.
