= Erna Villmer =

Estonian actress (1889–1965)

- Born: 1 March 1889; Tallinn, Russian Empire
- Died: 16 June 1965 (aged 82); Tallinn, then part of Estonian SSR, Soviet Union
- Other name: Erna Willmer
- Education: Moscow Art Theatre
- Years active: 1910–1937
- Spouses: Juhan Luiga (m. 1913; div. 1923) Ants Lauter (m. 1928)

Erna Villmer (also Willmer; 1 March 1889 – 16 June 1965) was an Estonian actress.

== Early life ==
Erna Villmer was born on 17 February 1889 in Tallinn. Father Juhan Villmer was from Paldisk, mother Anette Krusbach was from Tallinn. At the age of 7, she started attending the High School for Girls in the city.

The first personal gaming experience, or the inspiration that Erna Villmer later remembers, was sparked in a German language class when she had to read a poem. Something in her voice, expression, or gesture deserved the admiration of the whole class, and the teacher made a complimentary comment. After that remark from the teacher, she admitted to his mother that she wanted to become an actor. The mother then said that an actor must have a beautiful face and, first of all, a beautiful figure. The profession of an actor was then considered extremely inappropriate.

From 1907 to 1910, she studied at Moscow Art Theatre, but she didn't finish school.

== Early career ==
From 1910 until 1914 she worked at Estonia Theatre.

Villmer was seen as a talent, a new star in the Estonian troupe; she developed into a leading actress alongside Paul Pinna and Altermann. Reviewers appreciated her novel acting style - a subtle, psychological portrayal of parts, inner acting technique. They enjoyed the elaborateness of the roles, the ability to draw out details, but the viewers were most moved by her soulful and emotionally natural acting. A separate theme in Villmer's acting is her oversensitivity and emotionality, which, at its best, gave powerful internal charges to an outwardly meager performance, but in the worst cases, turned into a "watery" emotional play - there was no acting, and the actress disappeared in a flood of emotions. Villmer considered it a shortcoming that she couldn't laugh on stage; her nature lacked joy, which was a result of the poverty of joy from her childhood.

== World War I ==
At the beginning of the war, on 14 August 1914, the Estonian Society canceled the contract with the actors and disbanded the entire cast. The Russian government took the theater house from the society in order to bring a military hospital there from Liepāja. Following great demand, the governor gave in, and the Estonian theater could begin its second season in the new building during the Great War. The first war season was both a year of overcoming difficulties and losses for the troupe. In the second year of the war, Erna Villmer lived in Finland with her husband until Luiga was sent to Curonia to the Dune front in the fall of 1916. Villmer then moved back to Tallinn and started working again in Estonia. During the war, the audience demanded more jokes, pranks, operettas that would make them forget the pressure of war for a few hours. Despite the difficulties, the theater remained in operation—a great victory for the troupe, the theater, and Estonian culture in general. If the actors had not taken up the matter so energetically, the Estonian Theater would have remained closed for years.

== Career ==
The 1920s could be called the peak period of Villmer's work. She played a lot and well; critics praised her, calling her the most talented, most loved, and most intelligent actress of the Estonian theater. The breadth of her scope, alongside the former young girls and gentle maidens, encompasses deep, dramatic women, as well as coquettes and large ladies. During that time, she began working extremely closely with actor and director Ants Lauter, together, Estonian theater was brought to the height of art - a business-loving entertainment institution was becoming a professional theater.

In the 1930s, they still collaborated with Lauter at least once a season, and Villmer appeared in Lauter's productions, although not in all of them, nor in the lead roles. After all, Lauter had become a drama director, and she had to draw a strict line between her professional interests and personal life. To think more about the work of the entire theater than about herself and her actress husband, who was undoubtedly one of Estonia's best stage forces, but still with one disadvantage - the husband of a drama director. Cooperation could also be hindered by Villmer's disease, constant severe headaches.

The amount of work kept decreasing, the presumed cause of which was her illness. In 1937, her last year of work, Villmer played in only two productions. Her last role on the Estonian stage was in Fanny's play "Caesar". At the end of 1937, Villmer fell ill and was forced to stop working in the theater. Unfortunately, the time spent in a sanatorium in Germany was of no use, so she went to a sanatorium in Finland with the help of financial support. However, the disease progressed irreversibly, and the paralysis worsened. Soon she needed a wheelchair, a carer, and it was difficult to understand her speech.

Villmer was also an established director, becoming the second female director in Estonia, after Lydia Koidula. Her debut production was named “Pelléas and Mélisande”, in 1919.

Juhan Luiga
(m. 1913; div. 1923)

== Personal life ==
In 1913, she married psychiatrist, politician, and cultural figure Juhan Luiga. The couple had no children and divorced in 1923.

At the end of September 1923, Villmer traveled to Europe with Lauter. Marital relations with Luiga were strained to the extreme, the "romance" with Lauter had matured, and the situation demanded a solution. At the same stage of her life are also his increasingly severe attacks: extremely strong headaches. In 1925, Villmer had an operation for a uterine tumor; at that time, she was sidelined from theater life.

In 1928, Villmer married Ants Lauter.

== Death ==
Erna Villmer died on 16 June 1965 in Tallinn.

The life and work of the great actress has been covered in the film "Theatre Romance", which premiered in 2004, as well as in the book "Estonian Actress Erna Villmer", written by Katri Aaslav-Tepandi and published in 2007

== Awards ==
- 1935: Merited Actor of Estonia

== Theatre roles ==
1910

- Klärchen – H. Sudermann, "Soodoma hukatus" (lavastaja T. Altermann)
- Marthel – G. Hauptmann, "Rose Bernd" (lavastaja K. Jungholz)
- Effie – L.Thoma, "Moraal" (lavastaja teadmata)
- Ester – G. Wied, "2x2=5"
- Kati – J. Kunder, "Mulgi mõistus ja tartlase tarkus"
- Delfine – H. Bahr, "Kontsert" (lavastaja T. Altermann)
- Nora – H. Ibsen, "Nora" (lavastaja K. Jungholz)

1911

- Paula – G. Laufs, W. Jacoby, "Kullakoobas" (lavastaja T. Altermann)
- Roosi – H. Sudermann, "Liblikate lahing"
- Sonja – A. Tšehhov, "Onu Vanja"
- Mizzi – F. Molnar, "Kurat" (lavastaja Paul Pinna)
- Sigune – L. Fulda, "Salakuningas" (lavastaja T. Altermann)
- Dina Dorf – H. Ibsen, "Seltskonna toed" (lavastaja K. Jungholz)
- Olga – L. Andrejev, "Meie elupäevad" (lavastaja T. Altermann)
- Elina – M. Jotuni, "Vana kodu" (lavastaja E. Virgo)
- Tundmatu osa – L. Fulda, " Lollpea" (lavastaja T. Altermann)
- Cordelia – W. Shakespeare, "Kuningas Lear" (lavastaja K. Jungholz)
- Kamilla – G. Esmann, "Isad ja poeg"
- Signe – B. Bjornson, "Pankrot" (lavastaja K. Jungholz)
- Anna Danby – A. Dumas, "Kean" (lavastaja K. Jungholz)
- Leena – A. Kitzberg, "Tuulte pöörises" (lavastaja K. Jungholz)

1912

- Lidotška – A. Suhhovo-Kobõlin, "Kretšinski pulm."
- Hedwig – H. Ibsen, "Metspart" (lavastaja K. Jungholz)
- Ruth – O. Ernst, "Armastus ei väsi iial ära"
- Nimetu kõrvalosa – V. Gonsiorevski, I. Nikirovitš, "Napoleon ja pani Walewska"(lavastaja Paul Pinna)
- Klaara – F. Wedekind, "Kuningas Nicolo" (lavastaja K. Jungholz)
- Melide – H. Sudermann, "Rannalapsed" (lavastaja K. Jungholz)
- Saša – L. Tolstoi, "Elav laip" (lavastaja Paul Pinna)
- Klärchen – J. W. Goethe, "Egmont" (lavastaja K. Jungholz)
- Käthe – L. Fulda, "Naisori" (lavastaja H. Rantanen)
- Helena – A. Bisson, "Tundmatu naisterahvas" (lavastaja H. Rantanen)
- Elly – C. Rutoff, "Kivi" (lavastaja K. Jungholz)
- Anna – H. Bahr, "Lapsed" (lavastaja K. Jungholz)

1913

- Else – M. Dreyer, "Armu unenäod"
- Helene – B. Bjornson, "Kui noored viinapuud õitsevad" (lavastaja Karl Jungholz)
- Marie – H. Sudermnn, "Kodu" (lavastaja K. Jungholz)
- Marianne – H. Wuolijoki, "Talulapsed" (lavastaja K. Jungholz)
- Ophelia – W. Shakespeare, "Hamlet" (lavastaja K. Jungholz)
- Anna – C. R. Jakobson, "Arthur ja Anna" (lavastaja T. Altermann)
- Olga – L. Andrejev, "Meie elupäevad" (lavastaja T. Altermann)
- Eeva Marland – E. Vilde, "Tabamata ime" (lavastaja K. Jungholz)
- Irene – G. Dregely, "Hästiõmmeldud sabakuub" (lavastaja K. Jungholz)
- Rautendelein – G. Hauptmann, "Põhjavajunud kell" (lavastaja K. Jungholz)

1914

- Charlotte – C. Rössler, "Viis frankfurtlast" ( Lavastaja T. Altermann)
- Thea Elvsted – H. Ibsen, "Hedda Gabler" (lavastaja K. Jungholz)
- Antonida – A. Gorodetski "Elu tsaari eest" (lavastaja T. Altermann)
- Laura – E. Vilde, "Pisuhänd" (lavastaja T. Altermann)
- Maria – A. Needra, "Maa" (lavastaja K. Jungholz)
- Elga – G. Hauptmann, "Elga" (lavastaja T. Altermann)
- Selma – G. Malahov, O. Elsner, "Naistetundja" (lavastaja T. Altermann)
- Daniela – G. Okonkovski, "Kosjaturg" (lavastaja T. Altermann)
- Maria – K. Polonejev, "Kuristik" (lavastaja T. Altermann)
- Else – R. Presber, "Venus Anadyomene" (lavastaja T.Altermann)

1915

- Niina Korinkina – A. Ostrovski, "Süüta süüdlased" (lavastaja T. Altermann)
- Agafja – N. Gogol, "Kosjad" (lavastaja T. Altermann)
- Helene Heyer – R. Johnson Young, "Kuidas meest saab" (lavastaja A. Sällik)
- Maimu – Aspasia, "Kaotatud õigused" (lavastaja A. Sällik)
- Cecily – O. Wilde, "Bunbury" (lavastaja T. Altermann)
- Maali – A. Teodorov, "Elunälg" (lavastaja Paul Pinna)
- Hilda – O. Walther, "Ohvritall" (lavastaja A. Sällik)
- Teenija Stasia – J. K. Jerome, "Võõras" (lavastaja H. Vellner)

1916

- Grace – H. Bataille, "Pulmamarss" (lavastaja K. Jungholz)

1917

- Laura – E. Vilde, "Pisuhänd" (lavastaja K. Jungholz)
- Ellida – H. Ibseni, "Naine merelt" (lavastaja K. Jungholz)
- Mary – A. Sandberg, "Puuvilla kuningas" (lavastaja P. Pinna)
- Maie – L. Koidula, "Säärane mulk" (lavastaja K. Jungholz)

1918

- Dina Dorf – H. Ibseni, "Seltskonna toed" (lavastaja K. Jungholz)
- Irene – H. Dregely, "Hästiõmmeldud sabakuub" (lavastaja K. Jungholz)
- Helene – A. Bisson, "Tundmatu naisterahvas" (lavastaja K. Jungholz)
- Klara – B. Bjornson, "Üle jõu" (lavastaja K. Jungholz)
- Ruth – J. Galsworthy, "Justiits" (lavastaja K. Jungholz)
- Maria Antonovna – N. Gogol, "Revident" (lavastaja A. Lauter)
- Niina Korinkina – N. Ostrovski, "Süüta süüdlased" (lavastaja A. Lauter)

1919

- Maria – W. Schmidtbonn, "Appi! Laps kukkus taevast" (lavastaja K. Jungholz)
- Tundmatu osa – C. Rössler, L. Heller, "Tugitoolis"(lavastaja A. Lauter)
- Alma – H. Sudermann, "Au" (lavastaja K. Jungholz)
- Maria – A. Needra, "Maa" (lavastaja K. Jungholz)
- Hermia – W. Shakespeare, "Suveöö unenägu" (lavastaja K. Jungholz)
- Anja – A. Tšehhov, "Kirsiaed" (lavastaja A. Lauter)
- Lola – H. Sudermann, "Ülem elu" (lavastaja A. Lauter)
- Melisande – M. Maeterlinck, "Pelleas ja Melisande" (lavastaja E. Villmer)
- Trude Meyer – C. Viebig, "Võitlus mehe pärast" (lavastaja K. Jungholz)

1920

- Pero – W. Schmidtbonn, "Mängiv Eros" (lavastaja K. Jungholz)
- Rita Cavallini – E. Sheldon, "Romaan" (lavastaja A. Lauter)
- Ruth – M. Glass, "Potaš ja perlmutter" (lavastaja A. Lauter)
- Miss Mabel – O. Wilde, "Ideaalne abielumees" (lavastaja B. Kuuskemaa)
- Lygia – H. Sienkiewicz, N. Sabolštšikov-Samarin, "Quo vadis?" (lavastaja A. Lauter)

1921

- Alaine – S. Michaelis, "Revolutsiooni pulm" (lavastaja A. Lauter)
- Pauline Paola – A. Schnitzler, "Naine pistodaga" (lavastaja H. Kompus)
- Kolombiina – R. Lothar, "Kuningas Arlekiin" (lavastaja H. Kompus)
- Eeva – G. Moser, "Raamatukoguhoidja" (lavastaja A. Lauter)
- Berta – F. Schiller, "Willhelm Tell" (lavastaja K. Jungholz)
- Suzanne – Beaumarchais, "Figaro pulm" (lavastaja A. Lauter)
- Lady Waynflete – B. Shaw, "Kapten Brassboundi ärkamine" (lavastaja H. Kompus)
- Margot – H. Devere, " Navarra Henrik" (lavastaja A. Lauter)
- Myrrhina – Aristophanes, "Lysistrata" (lavastaja E. Villmer)

1922

- Therese – S. Vardi, "Dekoratsioon" (lavastaja H. Kompus)
- Mustlanna Sanda – L. Ganghofer, M. Brociner, "Waleni pulm" (lavastaja A. Lauter)
- Marie Claire – P. Frondaie, "Montmartre" (lavastaja H. Kompus)
- Paula – F. Schönthan, "Sabiini naiste röövimine" (lavastaja A. Lauter)
- Elma – J. H. Talomaa, "Igavene elu" (lavastaja K. Jungholz)
- Fatme – L. Kitzberg-Pappel, "Fatme" (lavastaja E. Villmer)
- Consuela – L. Andrejev, "Too, kes saab kõrvahoope" (lavastaja A. Lauter)

1923

- Helene – A. de Caillavet, R. de Flers, G. Rey, "Võrratu avantüür" (lavastaja A. Lauter)
- Ophelia – W. Shakespeare, "Hamlet" (lavastaja K. Jungholz)
- Irene – H. Dregely, "Hästiõmmeldud sabakuub" (lavastaja K. Jungholz)

1924

- Desdemona – W. Shakespeare, "Othello" (lavastaja A. Lauter)
- Alexandra – F. Molnar, "Luik" (lavastaja A. Lauter)
- Juudit – A. H. Tammsaare, "Juudit" (lavastaja A. Lauter)
- Jeanette Diele – T. Rittner, "Hundid ööl" (lavastaja A. Lauter)

1925

- Agatha – J. M. Barrie, "Imetlusväärne Chrichton" (lavastaja A. Lauter)
- Irja Sormuinen – E. Leino, "Simo Hurt" (lavastaja H. Kompus)
- Eeva Marland – E. Vilde "Tabamata ime" (lavastaja K. Jungholz)
- Gabriela – S. Garrick, "Daam lahutuspõhjusega" (lavastaja Ants Lauter)
- Camila – P. Mérimée, "Viimse jumalaarmu tõld" (lavastaja A. Lauter)
- Clara Urcino – L. Lunz, "Lindprii" (lavastaja A. Lauter)
- Mima – F. Molnar, "Punane veski" (lavastaja A. Lauter)
- Henriette – A. Strindberg, "Patt" (lavastaja P. Sepp)

1926

- Nadja – C. Goetz, "Muinasjutt" (lavastaja H. Laur)
- Delila – H. Raudsepp, "Kohtumõistja Simson" (lavastaja P. Sepp)
- Lotte – F. Arnold, E. Bach, "Vana Aadam" (lavastaja A. Lauter)
- Portia – W. Shakespeare, "Veneetsia kaupmees" (lavastaja P. Sepp)
- Tschng-Haitang – G. Klabund, "Kriidiring" (lavastaja P. Sepp)

1927

- Simone – J. Deval, "Oma naiivses puhtuses" (lavastaja P. Sepp)
- Roxane – E. de Rostand, "Cyrano de bergerac" (lavastaja P. Sepp)
- Lucrezia – C. Goldoni, "Smürna impressario" (lavastaja H. Gleser)
- Solveig – H. Ibsen, "Peer Gynt" (lavastaja P. Sepp)
- Melita – F. Grillparzer, "Sappho" (lavastaja A. Lauter)

1928

- Fanny – J. K. Jerome, "Fanny ja ta teenijad" (lavastaja P. Sepp)
- Rosalind – W. Shakespeare, "Armu- ja narrimäng" ("Nagu teile meeldib") (lavastaja A. Lauter)
- Leonore – F. Schiller, "Fiesco" (lavastaja P. Sepp)
- Lia Kampus – W. Hasenclever, "Peenem härra" (lavastaja A. Lauter)
- Anna Ostermann – A. Neumann, "Patrioot" (lavastaja A. Lauter)

1929

- Susy Courtois – M. Pagnol, "Elu aabits" (lavastaja P. Pinna)
- Eerika – M. Metsanurk, "Talupoja poeg" (lavastaja H. Kompus)

1930

- Susi – L. Fodor, "Vaene kui kirikurott" (lavastaja H. Paris)
- Kreosa –F. Grillparzer, "Medea" (lavastaja H. Gleser)
- Leslie – W. Somerset-Maugham, "Kiri" (lavastaja H. Paris)

1931

- Kirjaneitsi – A. Adson, "Lauluisa ja Kirjaneitsi" (lavastaja H. Kompus)
- Viktoria – B. Frank, " Torm veeklaasis" (lavastaja H. Paris)
- Germaine – S. Verneuil, "Saatan" (lavastaja E. Villmer)
- Halastajaõde – J. Galswothy, "Tuli" (lavastaja A. Lauter)
- Mare – A. Adson, "Neli kuningat" (lavastaja A. Lauter)
- Lu – F. Molnar, "Õnnehaldjas" (lavastaja H. Paris)

1932

- Anna – F. Langer, "Agul" (lavastaja H. Gleser)
- Koidula – H. Wuolijoki, "Koidula" (lavastaja A. Lauter)

1933

- Myra – C. Sherwood, "Waterloo sild" (lavastaja A. Sikemäe)
- Lilian – F. Cammerlohr, E. Ebermayer, "Sularaha" (lavastaja H. Kompus)
- Rita – S. Geyer, P. Frank, "Suhkur ja sool" (lavastaja P. Põldroos)

1934

- Melisande – H. Raudsepp, "Roosad prillid" (lavastaja A. Lauter)

1935

- Ellen Jones – S. Tradewell, "Mašinaal", külalisena Tallinna Töölisteatris (lavastaja Priit Põldroos)
- Ludmilla Jool – K. A. Hindrey, "Raidaru kirikumõis" (lavastaja H. Kompus)
- Rita Dina – F. Buch, "Kuivatage silmavett" (lavastaja P. Põldroos)
- Olivia – W. Shakespeare, "Mida soovite" ("Kaheteistkümnes öö") (lavastaja P. Põldroos)
- Jacqueline – E. Bourdet, "Äsja ilmunud" (lavastaja P. Põldroos)

1936

- Alice Galvoisier – J. Deval, "Preili" (lavastaja A. Lauter)
- Surm ja Bessie Legros – W. Somerset-Maugham, "Peavõit" (lavastaja A. Lauter)

1937

- Portia – W. Shakespeare. "Veneetsia kaupmees" (lavastaja P. Põldroos)
- Titania – W. Shakespeare, "Suveöö unenägu" (lavastaja A. Lauter)
- Ellen – H. Raudsepp, "Mees, kelle käes on trumbid" (lavastaja A. Lauter)
- Fanny – : Pagnol, "Tseesar" (lavastaja P. Põldroos)
