= Jüri Engelbrecht =

Estonian mechanics scientist

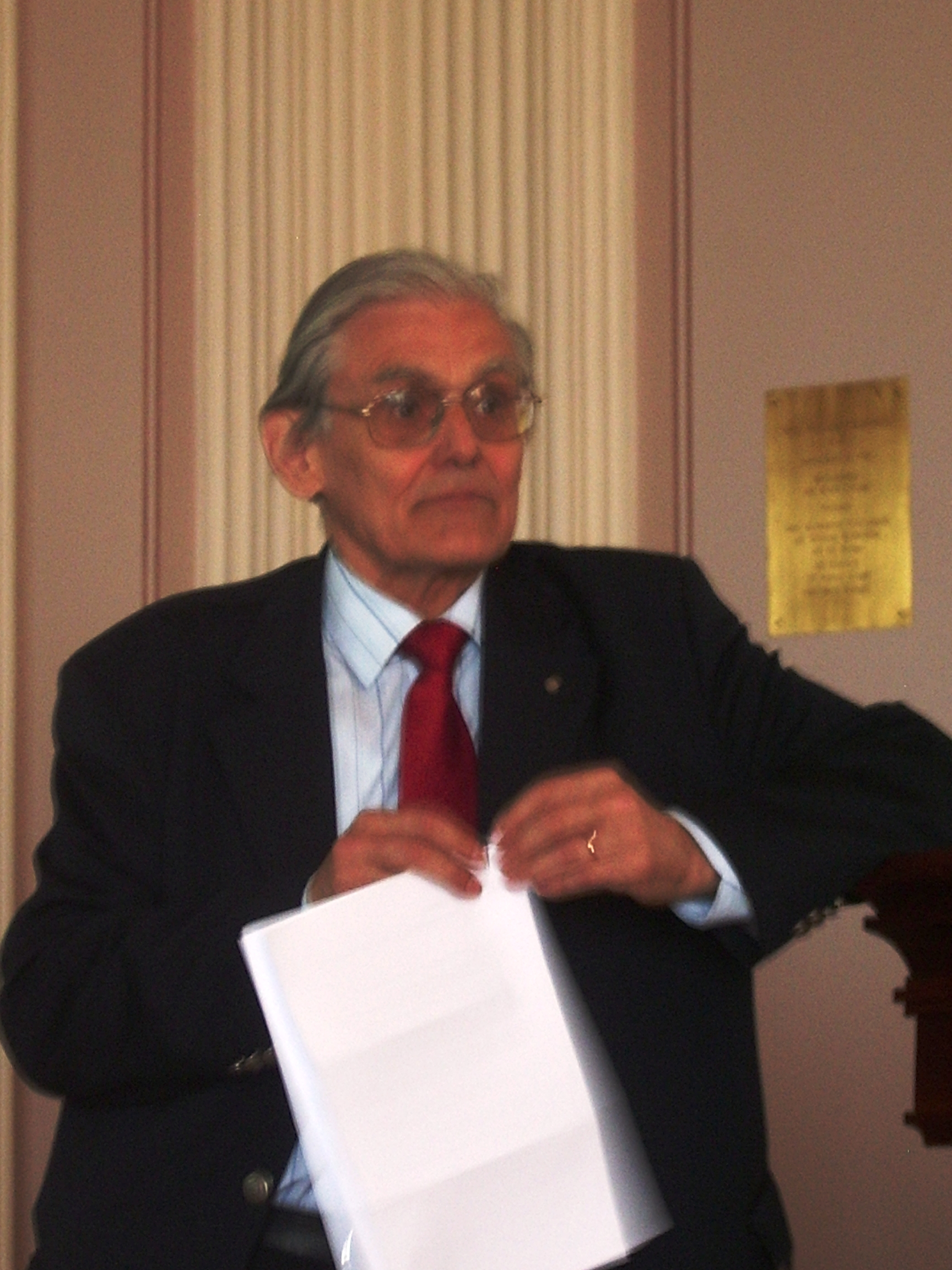
Jüri Engelbrecht

Jüri Engelbrecht (born 1 August 1939) is an Estonian mechanics scientist.

Since 1963, he has taught at the Tallinn University of Technology. From 1994 to 2004, he was president of the Estonian Academy of Sciences.

== Awards and recognitions ==
- 2020: Estonian Science Communication Award, lifetime achievement award
