= Aigar Vaigu =

Estonian physicist and science propagator

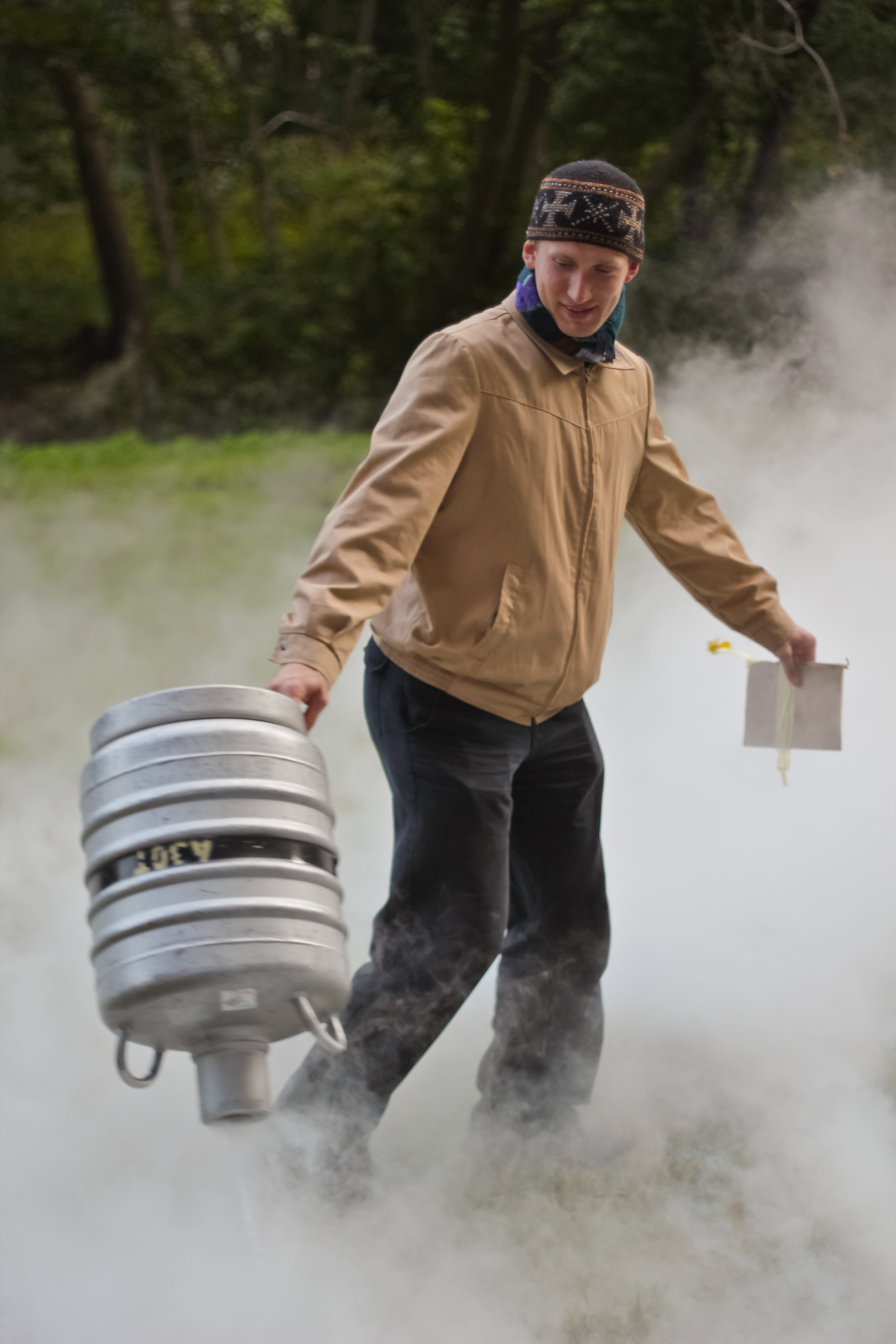
Aigar Vaigu in 2011

Aigar Vaigu (born on 6 November 1984) is an Estonian physicist and science propagator.

In 2009, he graduated from University of Tartu.

He has hosted the Eesti Televisioon (ETV) science competition television series Rakett 69.

In 2021, he was awarded with Order of the White Star, V class.
