= Rakett 69 =

Estonian television series

- Genre: Science Ultimate Edutainment
- Directed by: Indrek Simm
- Presented by: Season 1 - Jüri Muttika & Martha Piigli Season 2 - Aigar Vaigu Season 3 - Aigar Vaigu
- Judges: Heli Lukner; Mart Noorma; Aigar Vaigu
- Narrated by: Erik Lill
- Theme music composer: Tauno Aints
- Country of origin: Estonia
- Original language: Estonian
- No. of seasons: 12
- No. of episodes: 16 per season

Production
- Executive producer: Ylle Rajasaar
- Producer: Kaspar Kaljas
- Production locations: Tartu; Tallinn; Tapa Army Base; AHHAA
- Editors: Mirjam Matiisen; Heidi Hanso; Karin Martinson
- Running time: 30 minutes

Original release
- Network: Eesti Televisioon
- Release: January 15, 2011 – present

Rakett69 is an Estonian science competition show, broadcast by Estonian Television and funded by the Estonian Research Council.

European Broadcasting Union elected "Rakett69" as best educational TV show in Europe in spring 2012. It also won the Estonian Science Communication Award in the same year.

The objective of the program is to popularize the natural sciences in Estonia. The contestants run for the €10,000 scholarship to further pursue their career in their chosen field of science. The targeted audience of the program is 75,000 people.

== Set-Up ==
After a talent show, where each individual shows a bit of what they know, a panel of three judges chooses the few who are good enough to compete for the prize. The chosen contestants are initially divided into three teams, each with its own colour. In each episode the teams are given three assignments of varying difficulty, each with its own time limit. The judging panel awards points, depending on how well each team handled the assignments. The team with the fewest points at the end of the episode must vote a member out (technically, they vote for which team members they want to remain in the show). This goes on until there aren't enough contestants for three teams. The remaining contestants are divided into two teams and the show goes on, with the judges now deciding who remains from the losing team. When the contestants are down to three, they are split up and given neutral assistants to help them handle the assignments.

In the final, the remaining two contestants go head to head in some given theme to get the prize pool of €10,000.

== Seasons ==
Season	Original run	Winner	Runner-up	Contestants
1	January 15 – May 7, 2011	Juhan Koppel	Jaan-Eerik Past	12
2	January 7 – April 21, 2012	Timothy Henry Charles Tamm	Kristiina Tüür	15
3	January 12 – April 27, 2013	Reigo Kebja	Roland Matt	15
4		Thorny Valk	Janeli Õun	15
5		Karl Reinkubjas	Kaarel Siimut	15
6		Frida Laigu	Gregor Randla	15
7		Karl Vilhelm Valter	Gert Lees	15
8	January 6 - May 5, 2018	Kadi Siigur	Viktoria Siigur	15
