= Estonian Research Council =

Estonian Research Council (Estonian: Eesti Teadusagentuur, abbreviation ETAG) is an Estonian state foundation which main focus is to organize science life of Estonia. ETAG is a structural unit of Ministry of Education and Research.

The Director General of ETAG is Anu Noorma.

ETAG manages Estonian Research Information System (abbreviation ETIS). ETIS is a database which collects info of the facets of science of Estonia (research and development institutions, researchers, research projects and activities).

ETAG fund science-promoting TV programs, such as Rakett 69.
