= Structuralism in Literature =

Nonfiction book by Robert Scholes

Structuralism in Literature: An Introduction
- 1974 Book jacket
- Author: Robert Scholes
- Language: English
- Subject: Literary theory, Structuralism (Literary analysis)
- Set in: Europe, United States
- Published: 1974
- Publisher: Yale University Press
- Publication place: United States
- Media type: Print
- Pages: 221
- ISBN: 9780300018509 9780300017502
- OCLC: 1172085304
- Dewey Decimal: 801.9
- LC Class: PN98.S7 S3
- Website: Official website

Structuralism in Literature: An Introduction is a nonfiction book by literary critic and theorist Robert Scholes. The book discusses how to apply structuralism to literature. The book was originally published by Yale University Press in 1974.

== Synopsis ==
This book's general subject is structuralism, which is a way of looking at the world that focuses on how different parts relate to each other rather than on the individual parts themselves. It explains the main points of this approach and shows how these concepts can be applied to study literature. The reviewer for Modern Philology, Robert D. Denham, says that Scholes aims to introduce the European literary theory of structuralism to English readers and to develop the principles of this theory. Denham, also says that the book explains the work of significant structuralist critics, making it a useful introductory work. The book covers major figures like Saussure, Barthes, and Levi-Strauss.

== See also ==
- Philosophy of language
- Theory of language
- Course in General Linguistics by Ferdinand de Saussure

== Other reviews ==
- Prince, Gerald (1975). "Practical Poetics". Diacritics. 5 (2): 19–23. doi:10.2307/464638. JSTOR 464638.
- Beauchamp, William (1976). "Reviewed work: Structuralism in Literature. An Introduction, Robert Scholes". L'Esprit Créateur. 16 (1): 86–87. JSTOR 26280784.
- Sears, Donald A. (1975). "On the Relationships of Language and Literature". CEA Critic. 38 (1): 42–43. JSTOR 44375732.
