= Isaak Revzin =

Russian linguist and semiotician

Isaak Iosifovich Revzin (Russian: Исаак Иосифович Ревзин; 1923–1974) was a Russian linguist and semiotician associated with the Tartu–Moscow Semiotic School.

== Life ==
Isaac Revzin was born in Istanbul. He worked at the Institute of Foreign Languages. A structural linguist, he proposed that linguistics be developed as a formal axiomatic theory. Despite the fact that he was a specialist in machine translation, he only saw a computer (and from a distance) once in his life. He also wrote in collaboration with his wife, Olga Revzina. He died in Moscow.

His son, Grigory Revzin, living in Moscow, is an art critic and a journalist.

== Works ==
- (with Olga Revzina) 'Expérimentation sémiotique chez Eugene Ionesco', Semiotica 4 (1960), pp. 240–262.
- 'The relationship between structural and statistical methods in modern linguistics', Foreign developments in machine translation and information processing, 1961, pp. 43–53
- Models of language, London: Methuen, 1966. Translated by N. F. C. Owen and A. S. C. Ross from the Russian Modeli jazyka (1962).
- (with others) The fundamentals of human and machine translations, 1966
