= Tartu Linna-tütarlastekool =

School in Tartu, Estonia

Location
- corner of the Rüütli Street and Gildi Street; Tartu; Estonia
- Coordinates: 58°22′54″N 26°43′18″E

Information
- Established: 14 October 1804
- Closed: 1893

The Tartu Linna-tütarlastekool (German: Stadttöcherschule zu Dorpat) was a girls' school active in Tartu in Estonia between 1804 and 1893. It belonged to the most prestigious educational institutions for girls in the Baltic.

== History ==
The school was founded 14 October 1804. It was a German language school for girls of the German language burgher and higher classes. It was headed by Emilie Feldmann (1853–1866), Emma von Riekhoff (1866–1888) and Amalie Kemmerer (1888–1893). Initially a one class school, it became a two classes school in 1815. In 1853-54, girls' education in Tartu was reorganized, and the school was organized in the four classes quarta, tertia, secunda, and prima, with additionally two classes in 1874, quinta and sexta. The subjects were religion, French, German, arithmetic, history, geography, natural science, art, drawing and handicrafts. In 1887, the edict of Russification forced the schools in the Baltic countries to teach in the Russian language, after which the school was closed down when the teachers refused to reform it. In 1804 school was located at Rüütli tänav (Rüütli Street) and later moved to Raekoja plats 12 (Town Hall Square 12 also known as Bokovnev's House). Finally in 1857 school moved to the corner of Rüütli Street and Gildi Street where it was located until school closure in 1893.

== See also ==
- List of schools in Estonia
