= Tõnu Viik (astronomer) =

Estonian astronomer (born 1939)

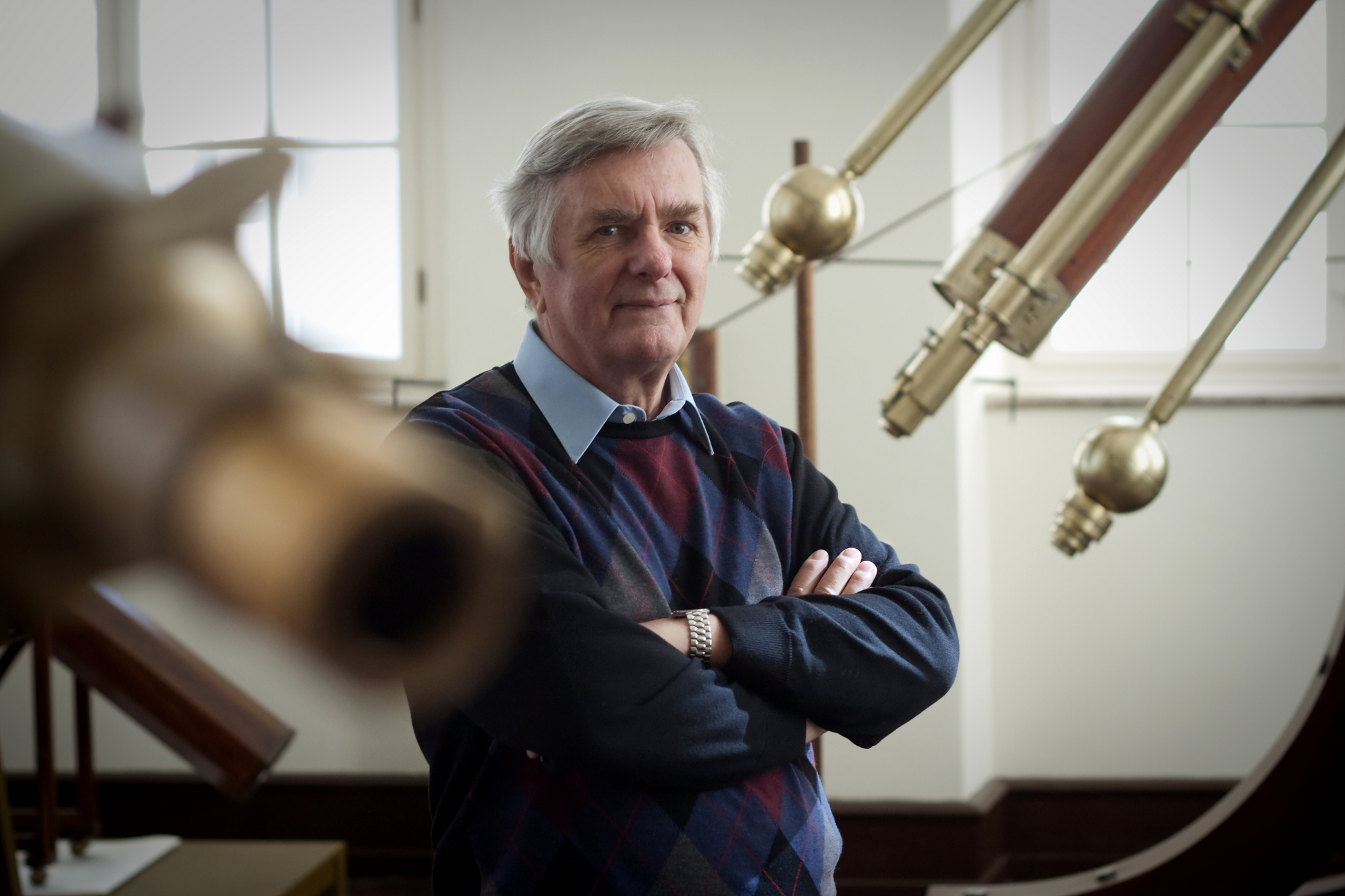
Tõnu Viik

Tõnu Viik (born 12 December 1939, in Rohuneeme) is an Estonian astronomer.

From 2008 to 2014 he was the president of Estonian Naturalists' Society.

== Awards and recognitions ==
- 2000: Order of the White Star, Third Class
- 2021: Estonian Science Communication Award, lifetime achievement award
