= Juri Lotman =

Estonian-Russian semiotician, literary scholar

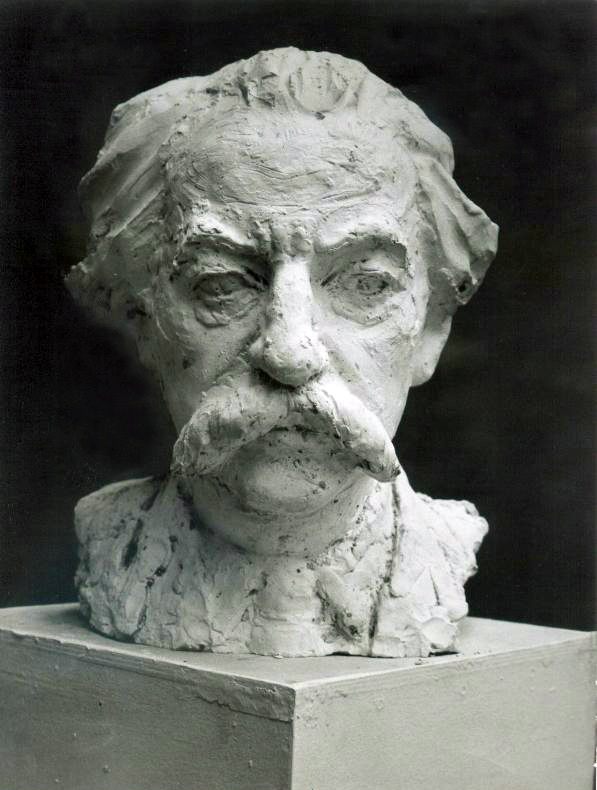
- Bust of Juri Lotman by Lev Razumovsky, 1980
- Born: Yuri Mikhailovich Lotman; 28 February 1922; Petrograd, Russian Soviet Federative Socialist Republic
- Died: 28 October 1993 (aged 71); Tartu, Estonia

Education
- Education: Leningrad State University

Philosophical work
- Era: 20th-century philosophy
- Region: Western philosophy
- School: Tartu–Moscow Semiotic School
- Institutions: University of Tartu
- Main interests: Semiotics
- Notable ideas: Semiosphere

Yuri Mikhailovich Lotman (Russian: Юрий Михайлович Лотман; 28 February 1922 – 28 October 1993) was a prominent Russian-Estonian literary scholar, semiotician, and historian of Russian culture, who worked at the University of Tartu. He was elected a member of the British Academy (1977), the Norwegian Academy of Science and Letters (1987), the Royal Swedish Academy of Sciences (1989) and the Estonian Academy of Sciences (1990). He was a founder of the Tartu–Moscow Semiotic School. The number of his printed works exceeds 800 titles. His extensive archive (now kept at the University of Tallinn and at the Tartu University Library) includes his correspondence with a number of Russian and Western intellectuals.

== Biography ==
Juri Lotman was born in the Jewish intellectual family of lawyer Mikhail Lotman and Sorbonne-educated dentist Aleksandra Lotman in Petrograd, Russia. His elder sister Inna Obraztsova graduated from Leningrad Conservatory and became a composer and lecturer of musical theory, his younger sister Victoria Lotman was a prominent cardiologist, and his third sister Lidia Lotman was a scholar of Russian literature of the second half of the 19th century on staff at the Institute of Russian Literature of the Russian Academy of Science (she lived in Saint-Petersburg).

Lotman graduated from the secondary school in 1939 with excellent marks and was admitted to Leningrad State University without having to pass any exams. There he studied philology, which was a choice he made due to Lidia Lotman's university friends (actually he attended university lectures in philology whilst he was still at secondary school). His professors at university were the renowned lecturers and academicians Gukovsky, Azadovsky, Tomashevsky and Propp. He was drafted in 1940 and during World War II served as a radio operator in the artillery. Demobilized from the army in 1946, he returned to his studies in the university and received his diploma with distinction in 1950. His first published research papers focused on Russian literary and social thought of the 18th and 19th century.

Lotman moved to the Estonian SSR in 1950, where he started teaching Russian literature while working on his dissertation (aspirantura), which he defended at the Leningrad State University in 1952. In 1954 he was appointed docent in the Department of Russian literature of Tartu University, eventually becoming head of the department. In 1961 he defended his doctoral dissertation, also at the Leningrad State University, and the following year achieved the rank of professor.

In the early '60s Lotman established academic contacts with a group of structuralist linguists in Moscow, and invited them to the first Summer School on Secondary Modeling Systems, that took place in Kääriku from 19th to 29 August 1964. The group gathered at the first summer school later developed into what is now known as the Tartu–Moscow Semiotic School. Among participants of the summer school, and later members of the Tartu–Moscow school, were such names as Boris Uspenskij, Vyacheslav Ivanov, Vladimir Toporov, Mikhail Gasparov, Alexander Piatigorsky, Isaak I. Revzin and Georgii Lesskis. As a result of their collective work, they established a theoretical framework for the study of the semiotics of culture.

This school has been widely known for its journal Sign Systems Studies, published by Tartu University Press ("Труды по знаковым системам") and currently the oldest semiotics journal in the world (established in 1964). Lotman studied the theory of culture, Russian literature, history, semiotics and semiology (general theories of signs and sign systems), semiotics of cinema, arts, literature, robotics, etc. In these fields, Lotman has been one of the most widely cited authors. His major study in Russian literature was dedicated to Pushkin; among his most influential works in semiotics and structuralism are Semiotics of Cinema, Analysis of the Poetic Text and The Structure of the Artistic Text. In 1984, Lotman coined the term semiosphere.

Juri Lotman's wife Zara Mints was also a well-known scholar of Russian literature and Tartu professor. They have three sons:

- Mihhail Lotman (born 1952) is professor of semiotics and literary theory at Tartu University, is active in politics and has served as a member of the Riigikogu (Estonian Parliament) as a member of the conservative Res Publica Party.
- Grigori Lotman (born 1953) is an artist.
- Aleksei Lotman (born 1960) is a biologist, since 2006 he has also been a politician and a member of parliament for the Estonian Greens party (2007–2011).

== Bibliography ==
- 1975. Lotman Jurij M.; Uspenskij B.A.; Ivanov, V.V.; Toporov, V.N. and Pjatigorskij, A.M. 1975. "Theses on the Semiotic Study of Cultures (as Applied to Slavic Texts)". In: Sebeok Thomas A. (ed.), The Tell-Tale Sign: A Survey of Semiotics. Lisse (Netherlands): Peter de Ridder, 57–84. ISBN 978-90-316-0030-4
- 1976. Analysis of the Poetic Text. (Translated by D. Barton Johnson.) Ann Arbor (Mich.): Ardis. ISBN 978-0-88233-106-5
- 1976. "The content and structure of the concept of "literature". PTL: A Journal for Descriptive Poetics and Theory of Literature 1(2): 339–356.
- 1976. Semiotics of Cinema. (Transl. by Mark Suino.) (Michigan Slavic Contributions.) Ann Arbor: University of Michigan Press, Семиотика кино и проблемы киноэстетики (in Russian) ISBN 978-0-930042-13-4
- 1977. The Structure of the Artistic Text. Translated from the Russian by Gail Lenhoff and Ronald Vroon. (Michigan Slavic Contributions 7.) Ann Arbor: University of Michigan, Department of Slavic Languages and Literatures. ISBN 978-0-930042-15-8
- 1979. "The origin of plot in the light of typology". Poetics Today 1(1–2), 161–184.
- 1990. Universe of the Mind: A Semiotic Theory of Culture. (Translated by Ann Shukman, introduction by Umberto Eco.) London & New York: I. B. Tauris & Co Ltd. xiii+288 p. ISBN 978-1-85043-375-0
- 2005. "On the semiosphere". (Translated by Wilma Clark) Sign Systems Studies, 33(1): 205–229.
- 2009. Culture and Explosion. (Semiotics, Communication and Cognition 1.) Translated by Wilma Clark, edited by Marina Grishakova.De Gruyter Mouton. ISBN 978-3-11-021845-9
- 2014. Non-Memoirs. Translated and annotated by Caroline Lemak Brickman, edited by Evgenii Bershtein, with an afterword by Caroline Lemak Brickman and Evgenii Bershtein. Dalkey Archive Press: Champaign, London, Dublin. ISBN 978-1564789969.

== See also ==
- Philosophy in the Soviet Union
- Semiotics
- Literary formalism
- Semiosphere
