= Mihhail Lotman =

Estonian literary scholar and politician

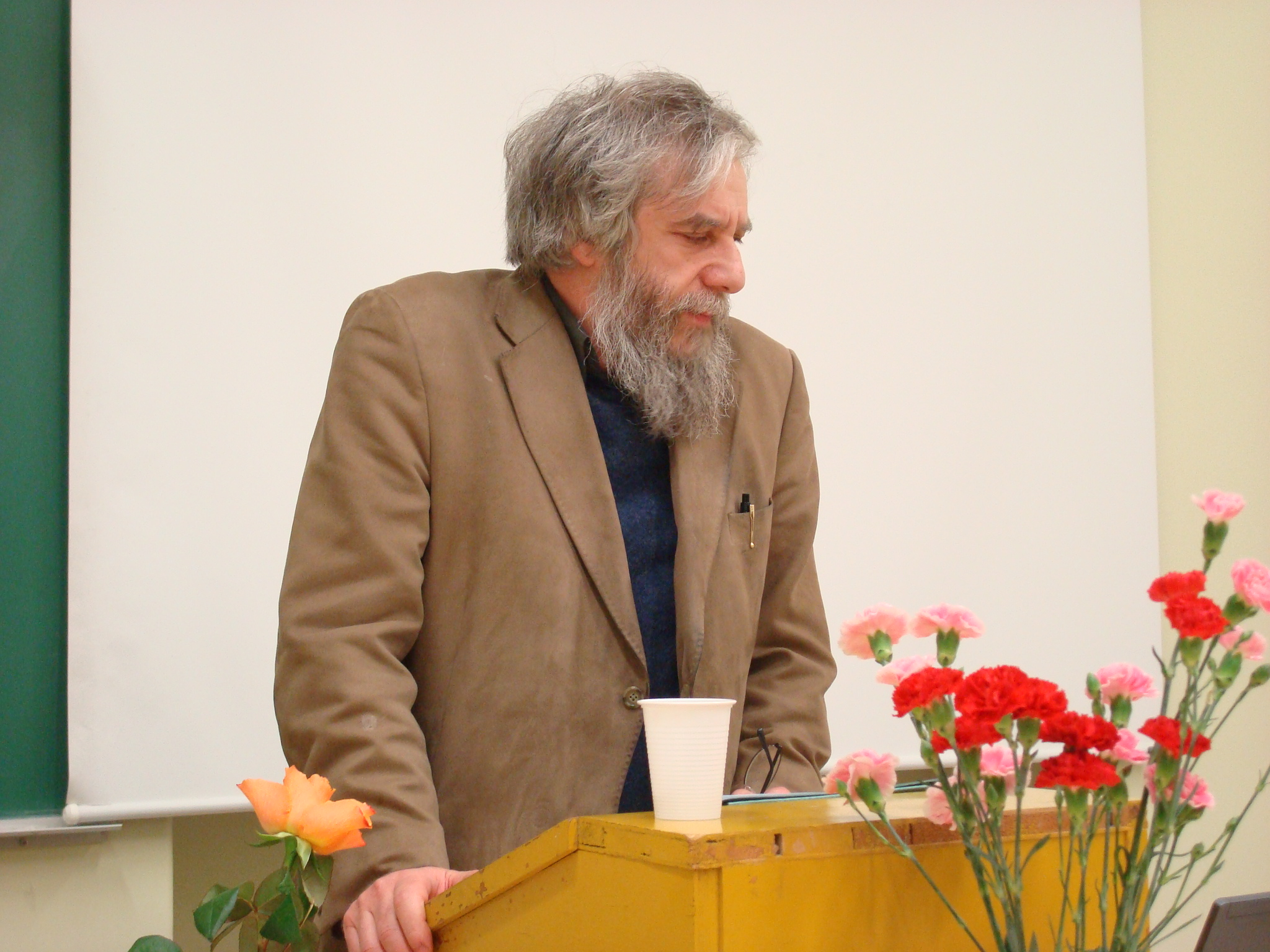
Mihhail Lotman (2010)

Mihhail Lotman (born September 2, 1952 in Leningrad, Soviet Union) is an Estonian literature researcher and politician, son of Juri Lotman and Zara Mints.

Mihhail Lotman's research fields include general semiotics and semiotics of culture as well as text theory and history of Russian literature. Lotman was a member of the board of Russian Cultural Society in Estonia from 1988 to 1994. Lotman is a professor of semiotics and literary theory at Tallinn University and also a member of a research group on semiotics at the University of Tartu.

Lotman was awarded the Medal of the Order of the White Star on February 2, 2001. In recent years, Lotman has been active in politics, serving as Member of the Riigikogu for the conservative Res Publica Party.

In 2010, Lotman defended Sofi Oksanen's novel Puhdistus against its opponents in Estonia.
