= Biocommunication =

Biocommunication may refer to:

- Biocommunication, the field of medical art and illustration, and other allied communication modalities; see Medical illustrator
- Biocommunication (science), more specific types of communication within (intraspecific) or between (interspecific) species of plants, animals, fungi and microorganisms
- Biocommunication (paranormal), theories of paranormal communication with plants
- The Journal of Biocommunication, a scholarly journal which provides information to the biocommunication community
