= Biocommunication (science) =

Communication within or between species

In the study of the biological sciences, biocommunication is any specific type of communication within (intraspecific) or between (interspecific) species of plants, animals, fungi, protozoa and microorganisms. Communication means sign-mediated interactions following three levels of rules (syntactic, pragmatic and semantic). Signs in most cases are chemical molecules (semiochemicals), but also tactile, or as in animals also visual and auditive. Biocommunication of animals may include vocalizations (as between competing bird species), or pheromone production (as between various species of insects), chemical signals between plants and animals (as in tannin production used by vascular plants to warn away insects), and chemically mediated communication between plants and within plants.

Biocommunication of fungi demonstrates that mycelia communication integrates interspecific sign-mediated interactions between fungal organisms, soil bacteria and plant root cells without which plant nutrition could not be organized. Biocommunication of Ciliates identifies the various levels and motifs of communication in these unicellular eukaryotes. Biocommunication of Archaea represents key levels of sign-mediated interactions in the evolutionarily oldest akaryotes. Biocommunication of phages demonstrates that the most abundant living agents on this planet coordinate and organize by sign-mediated interactions. Biocommunication is the essential tool to coordinate behavior of various cell types of immune systems.

== Biocommunication, biosemiotics and linguistics ==
Biocommunication theory may be considered to be a branch of biosemiotics. Whereas biosemiotics studies the production and interpretation of signs and codes, biocommunication theory investigates concrete interactions in and between cells, tissues, organs and organismus mediated by signs. Accordingly, syntactic, semantic, and pragmatic aspects of biocommunication processes are distinguished. Biocommunication specific to animals (animal communication) is considered a branch of zoosemiotics. The semiotic study of molecular genetics can be considered a study of biocommunication at its most basic level.

== Interpretation of abiotic indices ==
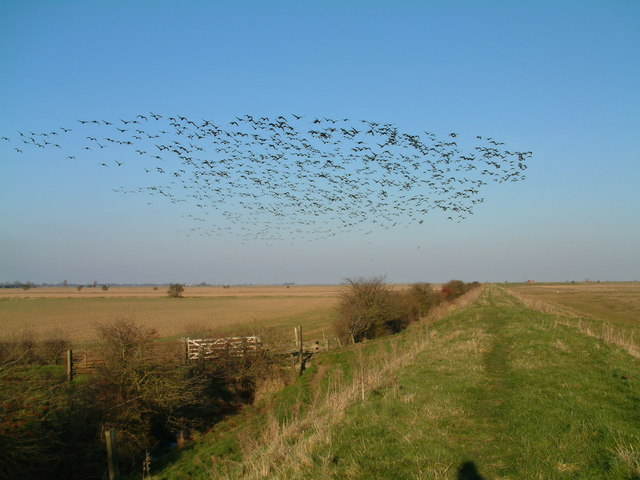
Birds migrate based on cues from their environment

Interpreting stimuli from the environment is an essential part of life for any organism. Abiotic things that an organism must interpret include climate (weather, temperature, rainfall), geology (rocks, soil type), and geography (location of vegetation communities, exposure to elements, location of food and water sources relative to shelter sites).

Birds, for example, migrate using cues such as the approaching weather or seasonal day length cues. Birds also migrate from areas of low or decreasing resources to areas of high or increasing resources, most commonly food or nesting locations. Birds that nest in the Northern Hemisphere tend to migrate north in the spring due to the increase in insect population, budding plants and the abundance of nesting locations. During the winter birds will migrate south to not only escape the cold, but find a sustainable food source.

Some plants will bloom and attempt to reproduce when they sense days getting shorter. If they cannot fertilize before the seasons change and they die then they do not pass on their genes. Their ability to recognize a change in abiotic factors allow them to ensure reproduction.

== Trans-organismic communication ==
Trans-organismic communication is when organisms of different species interact. In biology the relationships formed between different species is known as symbiosis. These relationships come in two main forms - mutualistic and parasitic. Mutualistic relationships are when both species benefit from their interactions. For example, pilot fish gather around sharks, rays, and sea turtles to eat various parasites from the surface of the larger organism. The fish obtain food from following the sharks, and the sharks receive a cleaning in return.

Parasitic relationships are where one organism benefits off of the other organism at a cost. For example, in order for mistletoe to grow it must leach water and nutrients from a tree or shrub.

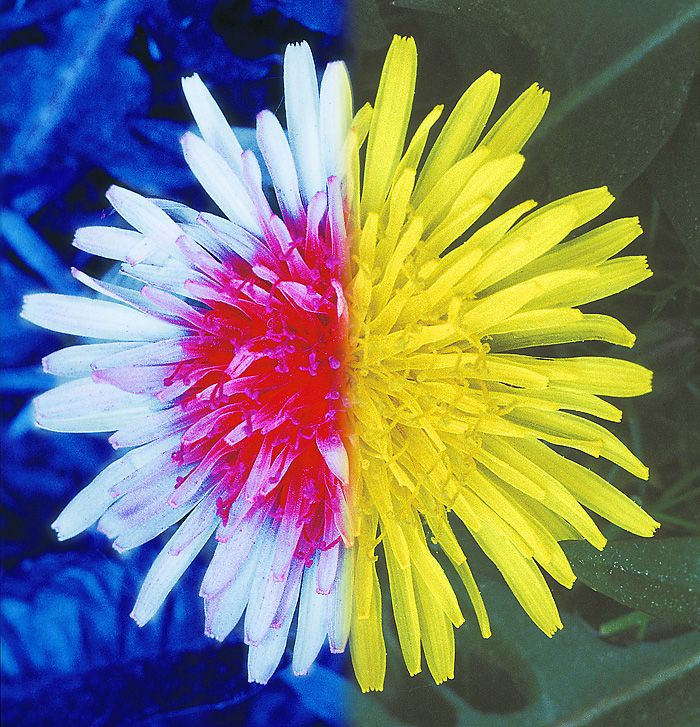
Dandelion flower under both UV light coloration (left) and visible light coloration (right). UV coloration in flowers has evolved to attract pollinators with vision in the ultraviolet range.

Communication between species is not limited to securing sustenance. Many flowers rely on bees to spread their pollen and facilitate floral reproduction. To allow this, many flowers evolved bright, attractive petals and sweet nectar to attract bees. In a 2010 study, researchers at the University of Buenos Aires examined a possible relationship between fluorescence and attraction. The study concluded that reflected light was much more important in pollinator attraction than fluorescence.

Communicating with other species allows organisms to form relationships that are advantageous in survival, and all of these relationships are all based on some form of trans-organismic communication.

== Inter-organismic communication ==
Inter-organismic communication is communication between organisms of the same species like bacteria (conspecifics). Inter-organismic communication includes human speech, which is key to maintaining social structures.

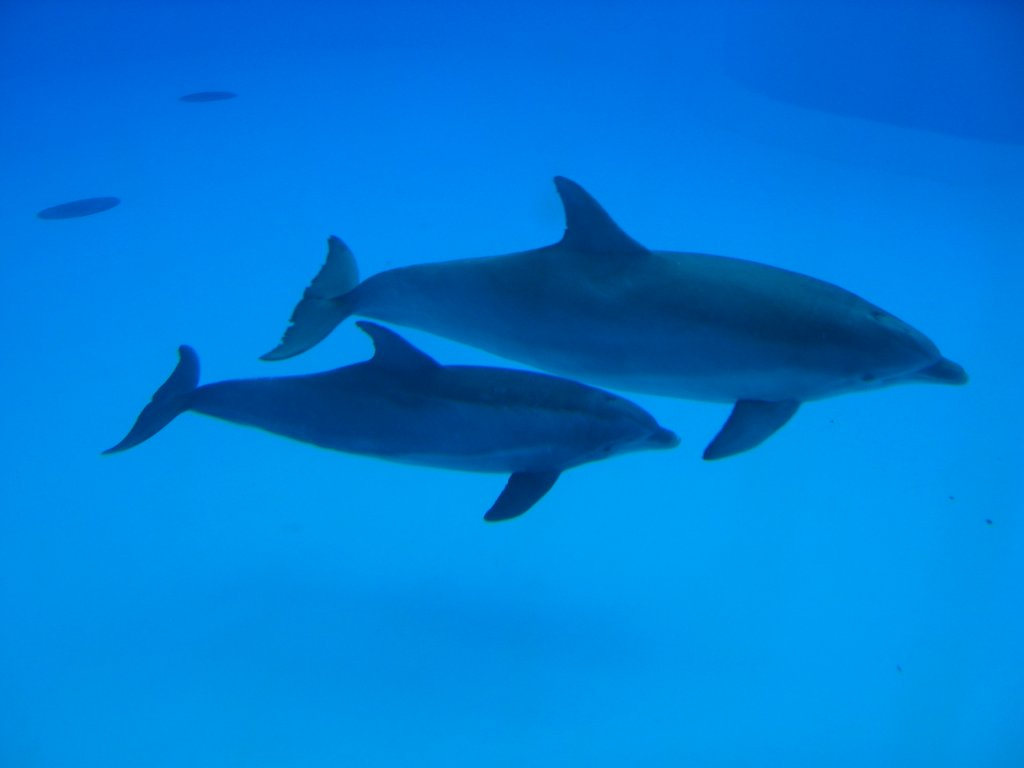
Dolphins communicate with one another to aid navigation

Dolphins communicate with one another in a number of ways by creating sounds, making physical contact with one another and through the use of body language. Dolphins communicate vocally through clicking sounds and pitches of whistling specific to only one individual. The whistling helps communicate the individual's location to other dolphins. For example, if a mother loses sight of her offspring, or when two familiar individuals cannot find each other, their individual pitches help navigate back into a group. Body language can be used to indicate numerous things such as a nearby predator, to indicate to others that food has been found, and to demonstrate their level of attractiveness in order to find a mating partner, and even more.

However, mammals such as dolphins and humans are not alone communicating within their own species. Peacocks can fan their feathers in order to communicate a territorial warning. Bees can tell other bees when they have found nectar by performing a dance when they return to the hive. Karl von Frisch received the Nobel prize for deciphering bee communication in 1973. Deer may flick their tails to warn others in their trail that danger is approaching.

== Sexual communication ==
Sexual communication is the use of biocommunication signals to facilitate sexual interaction. Sexual communication appears to have three different aspects. (1) First, signals are employed to facilitate sexual interaction between individuals. (2) Second, signals are used to facilitate outbreeding and reduce inbreeding. (3) Third, signals are used to facilitate sexual selection among potential mates. It was proposed that these three aspects of sexual communication respectively promote the repair of DNA damage in the genomes passed on to progeny, the masking of mutations in the genomes of progeny, and selection for genetic fitness in a mating partner. Examples of sexual communication have been described in bacteria, fungi, protozoa, insects, plants and vertebrates.

== Intra-organismic communication ==
Intra-organismic communication is not solely the passage of information within an organism, but also concrete interaction between and within cells of an organism, mediated by signs. This could be on a cellular and molecular level. An organism's ability to interpret its own biotic information is extremely important. If the organism is injured, falls ill, or must respond to danger, it needs to be able to process that physiological information and adjust its behavior.

For example, when the human body starts to overheat, specialized glands release sweat, which absorbs the heat and then evaporates.

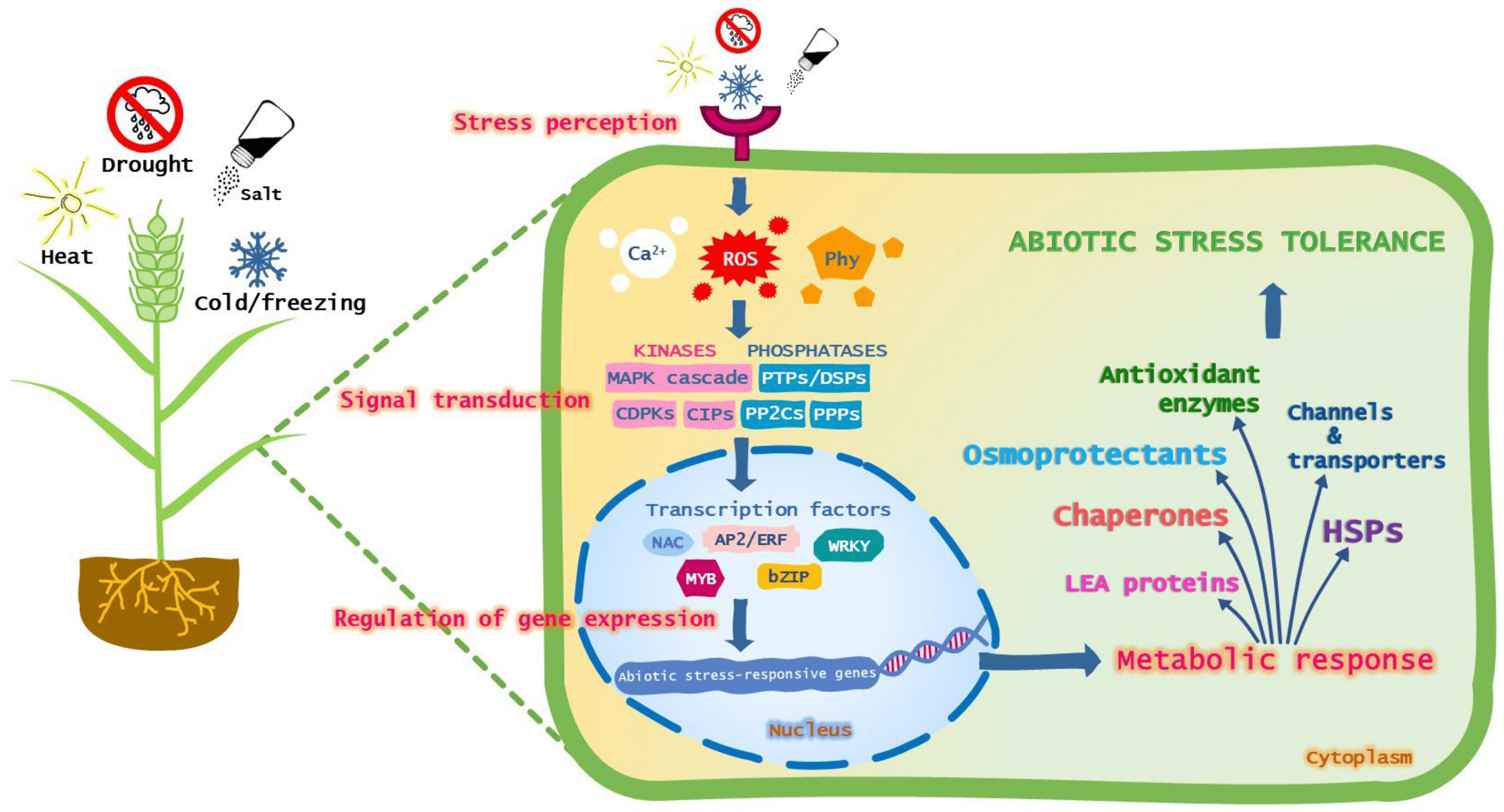
A stress signal being transmitted intracellularly through a plant's phytohormones

This communication is imperative to survival in many species including plant life. Plants lack a central nervous system so they rely on a decentralized system of chemical messengers. This allows them to grow in response to factors such as wind, light and plant architecture. Using these chemical messengers, they can react to the environment and assess the best growth pattern. Essentially, plants grow to optimize their metabolic efficiency.

Humans also rely on chemical messengers for survival. Epinephrine, also known as adrenaline, is a hormone that is secreted during times of great stress. It binds to receptors on the surface of cells and activates a pathway that alters the structure of glucose. This causes a rapid increase in blood sugar. Adrenaline also activates the central nervous system increasing heart rate and breathing rate. This prepares the muscles for the body's natural fight-or-flight response.

Organisms rely on many different means of intra-organismic communication. Whether it is through neural connections or chemical messengers (including hormones), intra-organismic biocommunication evolved to respond to threats, maintain homeostasis and ensure self preservation.

== Language hierarchy ==
Subhash Kak's hierarchy of language as biocommunications positions communication on a gradient of three levels of complexity: associative, re-organizational, and quantum (what does quantum mean?). Most primitive is the associative language that is simple response-signal communication, such as insect pheromone trails or bird alarm calls not requiring cognitive flexibility. Re-organizational language is the more advanced development that allows the communication of situation-dependent information—such as the honeybee dance that tells food locations or the primate calls that change based on situation-dependent variables—demonstrating higher adaptability and potential structure of the syntax. Quantum language(?) is the most advanced and speculative and is associated with abstract, potentially quantum-based (?) communication with the complexity of human language to communicate abstract concepts and emotion the best example, but it is not described as to how it would apply to animals other than humans. In contrast to biological communication quantum language(?) concepts are not applied to sign-mediated interactions in plants, fungi, protozoa or bacteria. The hierarchy suggests the complexity of communication is evolving, although its quantum features and relationship to formal theories of language such as the Chomsky hierarchy is controversial with scientists.

== See also ==
- Animal communication
- Biosemiotics
- Cetacean intelligence
- Chemotropism
- Cognition
- Human–animal communication
- Molecular genetics
- Plant communication
- Plant perception (physiology)
- Plant physiology
- Zoosemiotics
