= Flower =

Reproductive structure in flowering plants

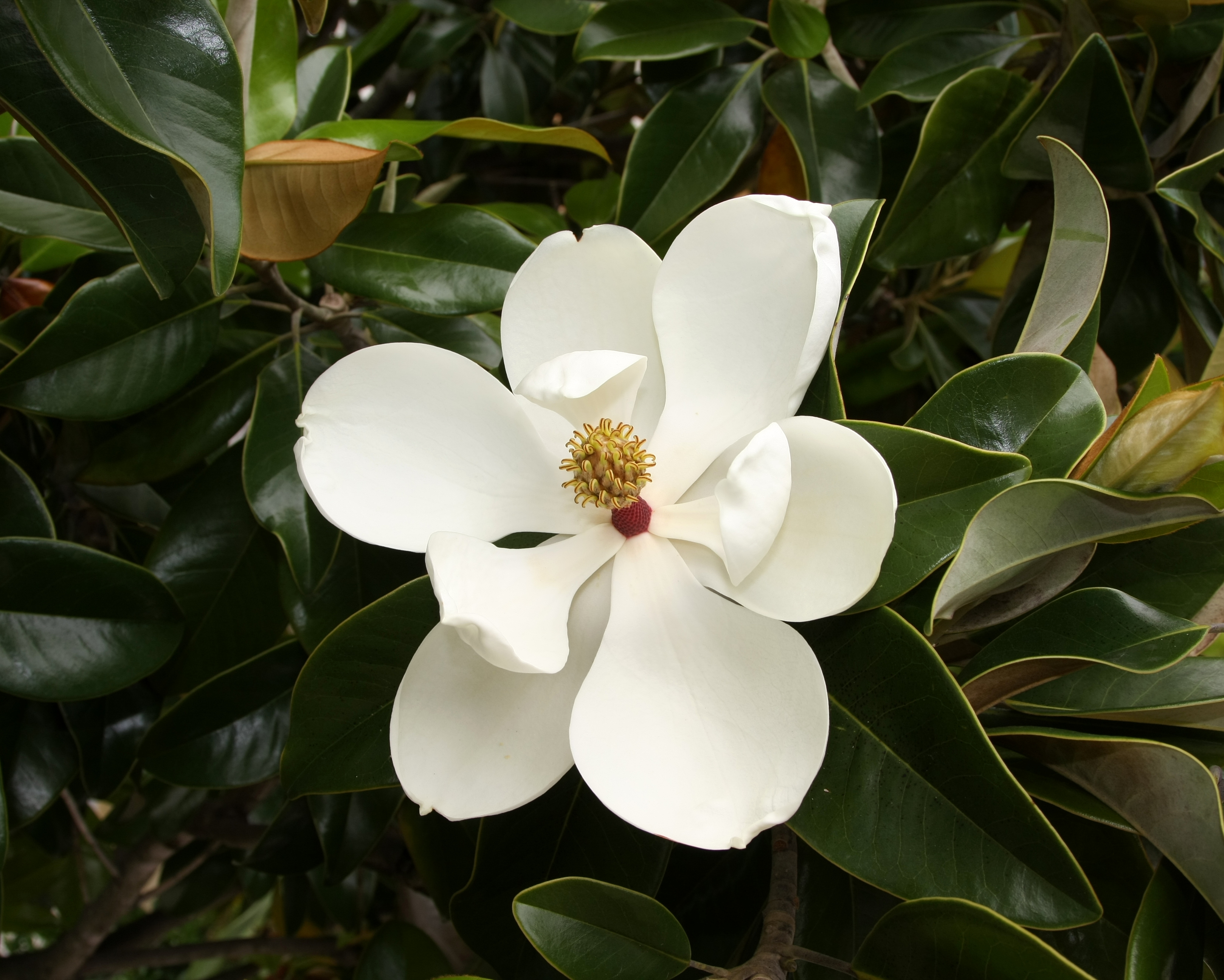
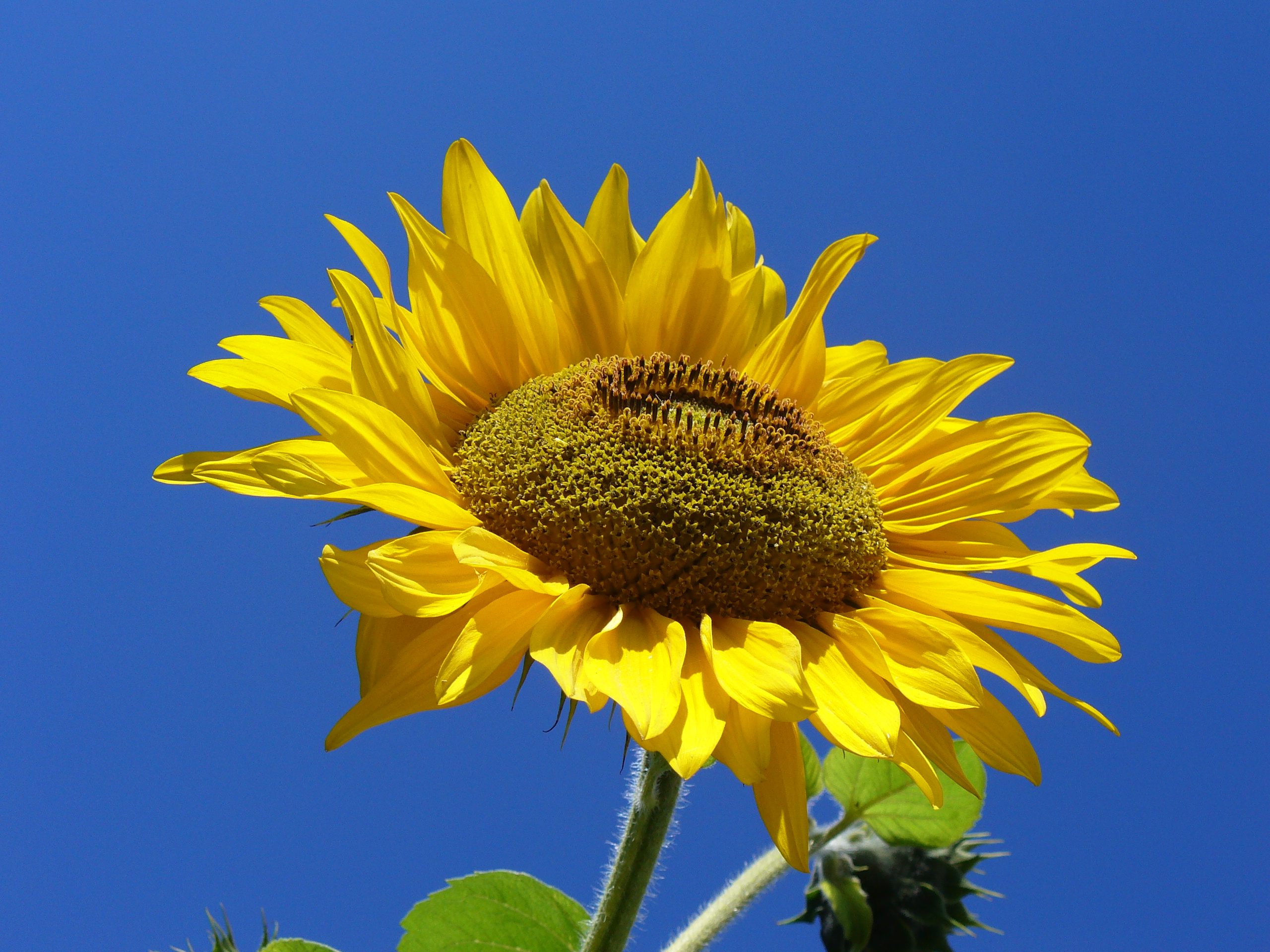
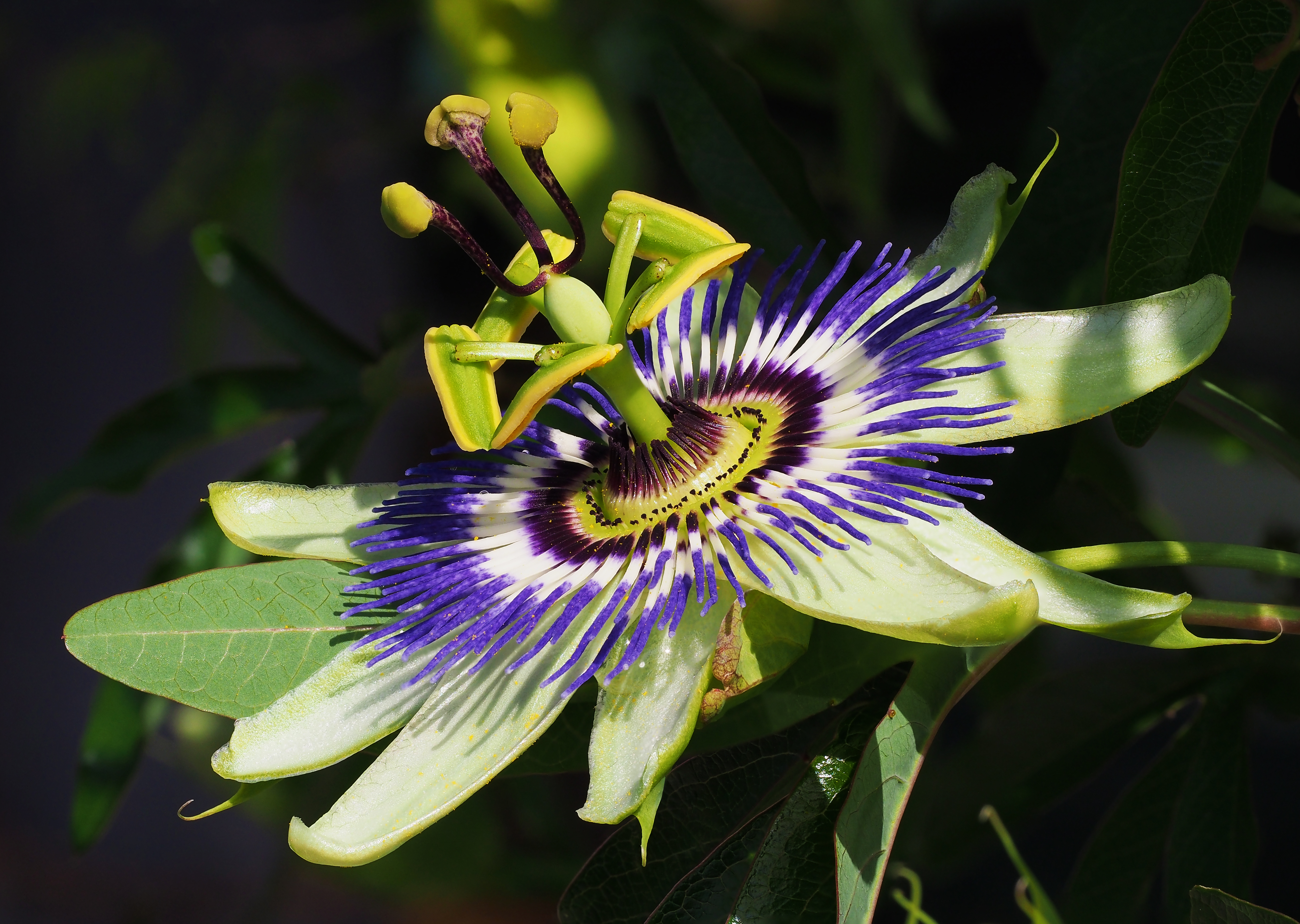
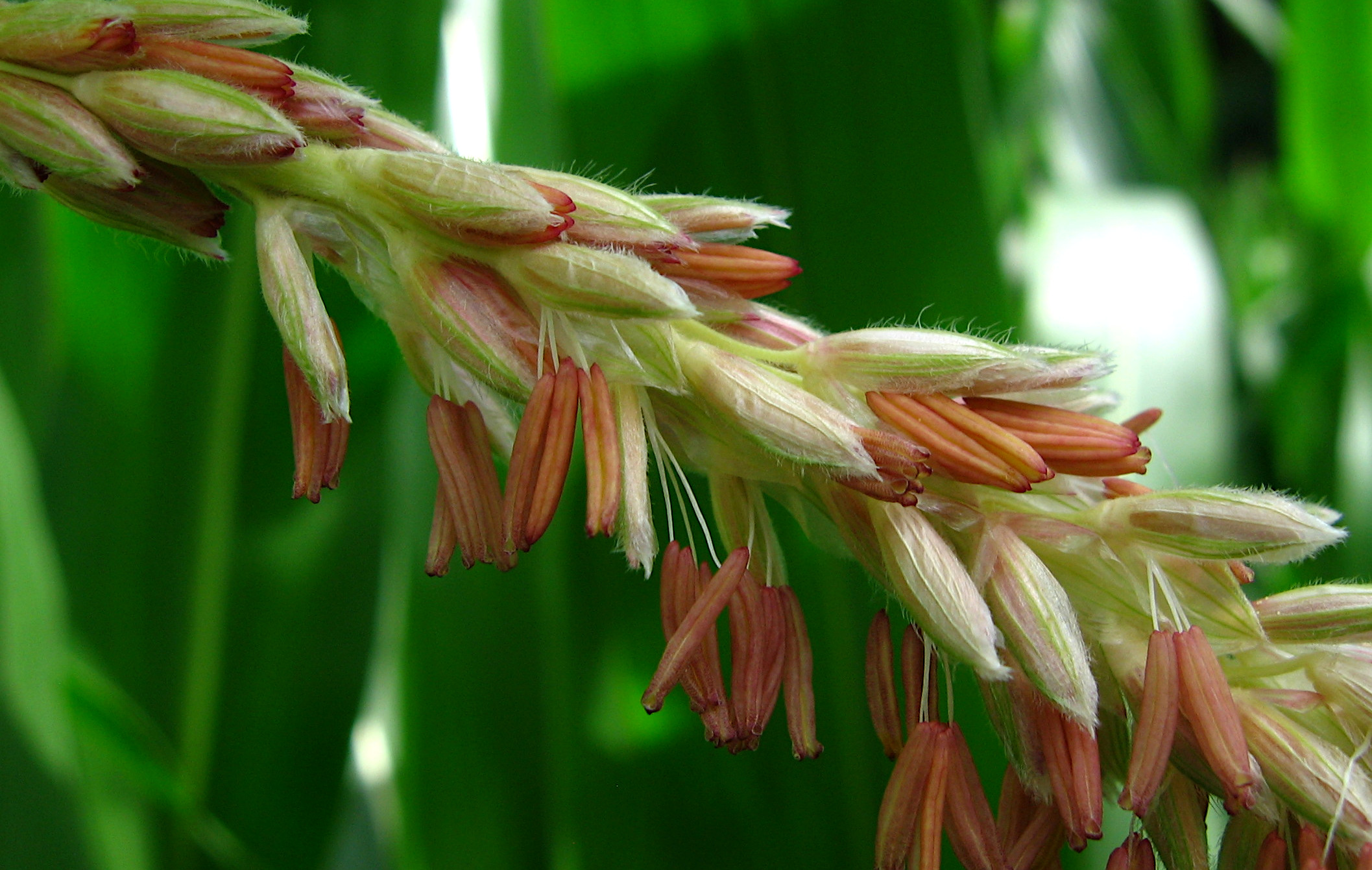
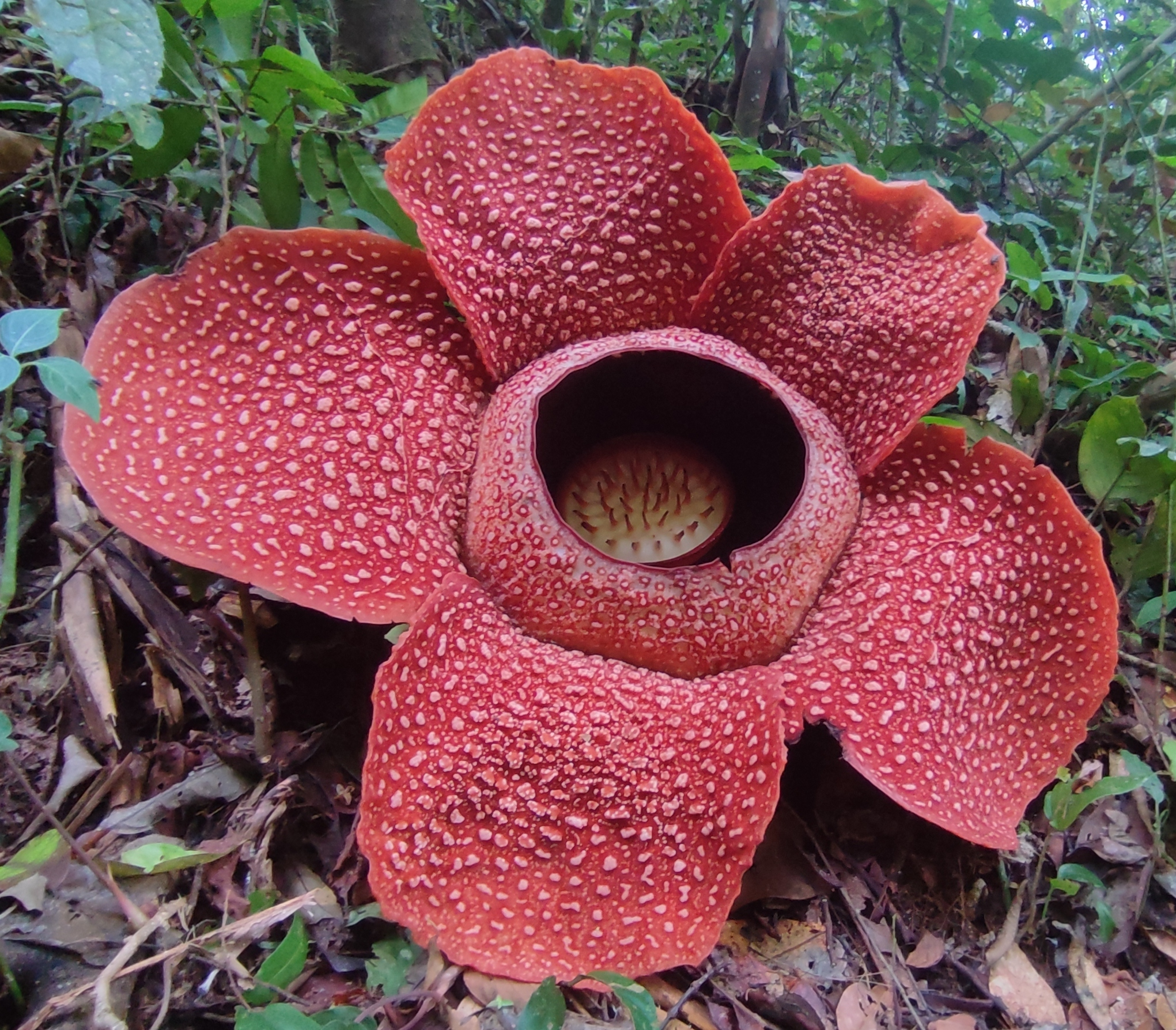
From left to right, top to bottom: Magnolia grandiflora (southern magnolia), Phalaenopsis bellina, Helianthus annuus (common sunflower), Passiflora caerulea (blue passionfruit), Zea mays (male flowers of maize or corn), and Rafflesia arnoldii (corpse flower)

Flowers, also known as blossoms and blooms, are the reproductive structures of flowering plants. Typically, they are structured in four circular levels around the end of a stalk. These include: sepals, which are modified leaves that support the flower; petals, often designed to attract pollinators; male stamens, where pollen is presented; and female gynoecia, where pollen is received and its movement is facilitated to the egg. When flowers are arranged in a group, they are known collectively as an inflorescence.

The development of flowers is a complex and important part in the life cycles of flowering plants. In most plants, flowers are able to produce sex cells of both sexes. Pollen, which can produce the male sex cells, is transported between the male and female parts of flowers in pollination. Pollination can occur between different plants, as in cross-pollination, or between flowers on the same plant or even the same flower, as in self-pollination. Pollen movement may be caused by animals, such as birds and insects, or non-living things like wind and water. The colour and structure of flowers assist in the pollination process.

After pollination, the sex cells are fused together in the process of fertilisation, which is a key step in sexual reproduction. Through cellular and nuclear divisions, the resulting cell grows into a seed, which contains structures to assist in the future plant's survival and growth, both an embryo and (usually) a food reserve, within a protective coat. At the same time, the female part of the flower forms into a fruit, and the other floral structures die. The function of fruit is to protect the seed and aid in its dispersal away from the mother plant. Seeds can be dispersed by living things, such as birds who eat the fruit and distribute the seeds when they defecate. Non-living things like wind and water can also help to disperse the seeds.

Flowers first evolved between 150 and 190 million years ago, in the Jurassic. Plants with flowers replaced non-flowering plants in many ecosystems, as a result of flowers' superior reproductive effectiveness. In the study of plant classification, flowers are a key feature used to differentiate plants. For thousands of years humans have used flowers for a variety of other purposes, including: decoration, medicine, food, and perfumes. In human cultures, flowers are used symbolically and feature in art, literature, religious practices, ritual, and festivals. All aspects of flowers, including size, shape, colour, and smell, show immense diversity across flowering plants. They range in size from 0.1 mm (1/250 inch) to 1 metre (3.3 ft), and in this way range from highly reduced and understated, to dominating the structure of the plant. Plants with flowers dominate the majority of the world's ecosystems, and themselves range from tiny orchids and major crop plants to large trees.

== Etymology ==
In botany, flowers are defined as the reproductive structures of angiosperms (flowering plants), while cones are regarded as the gymnosperm equivalent. (Note: There are some gymnosperm cones which resemble flowers. The cones of Ginkgo biloba, for example, are mostly considered to be simple strobili, and not flowers.) Bloom is similarly defined, but may also be used to describe the collective of flowers on a plant, as in the phrase: covered with bloom. Flower is also commonly used to describe the whole of a plant that produces flowers.

Flower entered Middle English via Old French flor from earlier Latin flōs, flōris and before that Proto-Italic *flōs, all of which had the same meaning 'flower'. The spelling flour was more common in English until the 17th century, when it became specialised to mean "ground grain" — originally an instance of figurative flower meaning "best part; finest". The Old English word for flower was blossom, which is still used today, but refers especially to the flowers of edible fruit trees, and not to the whole flowering plant. Flower, bloom, and blossom are all cognates and are derived from the Proto-Indo-European word *bʰleh₃ōs ('blossoming'). Both bloom and blossom refer to flowers as well as the state of flowering; as in the phrases: in bloom or in blossom.

== Function ==
The main purpose of a flower is reproduction of the individual, aiding in the survival of the species. Flowers not only produce spores, which become gametophytes that produce sex cells, leading to fertilised cells, but also develop and help disseminate seeds. Sexual reproduction between plants results in evolutionary adaptation, which improves species survival. Plants favour cross-pollination because it promotes the joining of sex cells from genetically distinct plants of the same species, thereby increasing genetic diversity. Facilitating this process is a key function of flowers and is often reflected in their form and structure. Features designed to attract pollinators are among the most common adaptations.

== Structure ==
Diagram of flower structure

The structure of a flower, termed its morphology, can be considered in two parts: the vegetative part, consisting of non-reproductive structures such as petals; and the reproductive or sexual parts. A stereotypical, or complete, flower is made up of four kinds of structures arranged in sets called whorls. They grow around the tip of a short stalk or axis, called a receptacle. The four main whorls (starting from the base of the flower and working upwards) are the calyx, petals, androecium, and gynoecium.

=== Vegetative ===
The non-reproductive or vegetative part of the flower, known collectively as the perianth, consists of calyx (the modified outer leaves), and the petals. The receptacle is the thickened part of the flower stalk, called the pedicel, which supports all of the other flower structures.

==== Calyx ====
The sepals, collectively called the calyx, are modified leaves that occur on the outermost whorl of the flower. They are leaf-like, in that they have a broad base, pores, green pigment, and may have analogous outgrowths from the stem. Sepals are often waxy, tough, and grow quickly to protect the flower as it develops. Although they sometimes fall off at maturity, sepals more commonly persist to protect the fruit and aid in its dispersal. The sepals in some flowers may be partially or completely fused together.

==== Petals ====
The petals, collectively called the corolla, are almost or completely fibreless leaf-like structures that form the innermost whorl of the perianth. They are often delicate and thin and are usually coloured, shaped, or scented, to encourage and facilitate pollination. The petals may be fused together. Petals often feature UV patterns invisible to humans but visible to pollinators. In some flowers, petals and sepals are indistinguishable from one another.

=== Reproductive ===
All flowering plants are heterosporous, that is, every individual plant produces two types of spores. Spores are formed from mature plants, which contain two sets of chromosomes, and are divided into microspores and megaspores—the precursors to pollen and embryo sacs respectively. Pollen and embryo sacs are the male and female gametophytes, sex cell-producing structures, and contain just one set of chromosomes. Microspores are produced by meiosis inside anthers, the male part of flowers, and megaspores are produced inside ovules contained within the ovary. As with all heterosporous plants, the gametophytes also develop inside the spores.

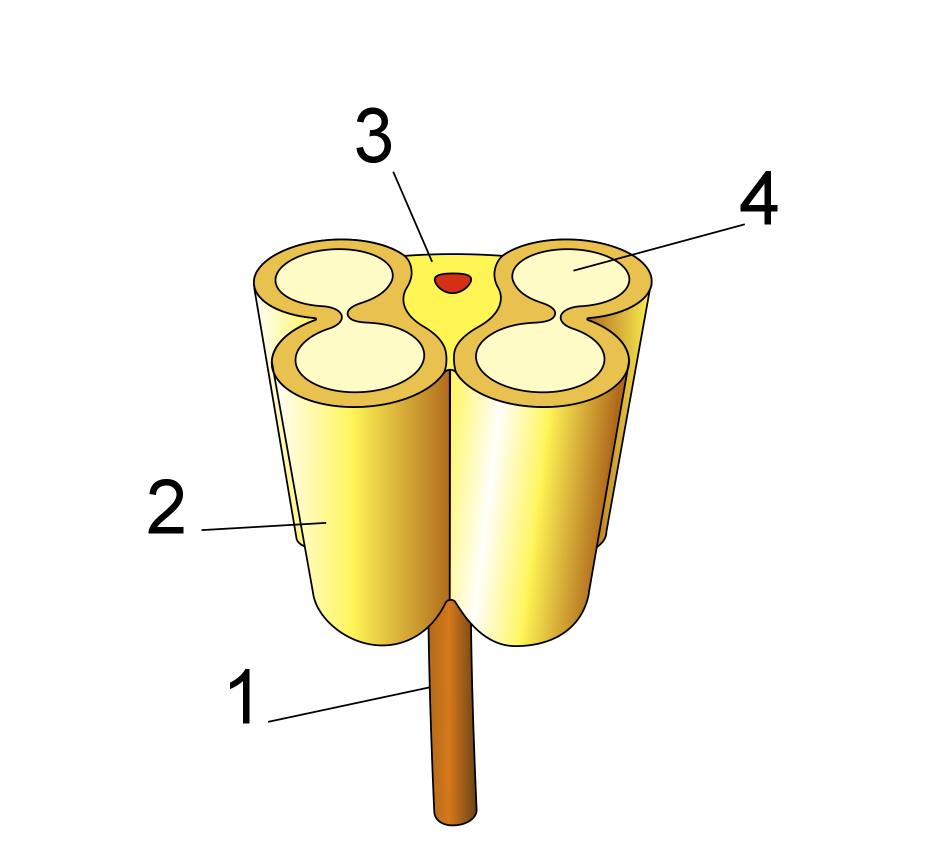
Diagram of anther in cross section. 1: Filament; 2: Theca; 3: Connective (conducting vessels in red); 4: Pollen sac

Diagram of angiosperm ovule

==== Male ====
The androecium is the whorl of male parts called stamens, which produce pollen. Stamens consist typically of an anther, made up of four pollen sacs arranged in two sheaths called thecae, connected to a filament, or stalk. The anther contains microspores which become pollen, the male gametophyte, after undergoing meiosis. Although they exhibit the widest variation among floral organs, (Note: Stamens range in number, size, shape, orientation, and in their point of connection to the flower. In general, plants have only one type of stamen, but there are plant species where the flowers have two types; a typical one, and one with anthers that produce sterile pollen meant to attract pollinators with food (palynivory). These plants are called heterantherous.) the androecium is usually confined just to one whorl and to two whorls only in rare cases.

==== Female ====
The gynoecium, consisting of one or more carpels, is the female part of the flower and found on the innermost whorl. Each carpel consists of: a stigma, which receives pollen; a style, the stalk; and an ovary, which contains the ovules, and the female gametophytes by extension. Carpels may be fused together and are often described collectively as a pistil. Inside the ovary, the ovules are attached to the placenta by structures called funiculi.

=== Variation ===
Although most plants have flowers with four whorls—protective leaves, petals, male parts, and female parts—and their typical sub-structures, they vary greatly between flowering plants. This variation encompasses all aspects of flowers, including size, shape, and colour. Flowers range in size from 0.1 mm (1/250 in) (duckweed) to 1 m (3.3 ft) in diameter (corpse flower). Additionally, the four main parts of a flower are generally defined by their positions and not by their function. Many flowers lack some parts, have parts that are modified for other functions, or contain parts that look like what is typically another part. In some flowers, organs such as stamens, stigmas, and sepals are modified to resemble petals. This is most common in cultivation (such as of roses), where flowers with many additional "petals" are found to be more attractive.

Most flowers have symmetry. When the flower is bisected through the central axis from any point and symmetrical halves are produced, the flower is said to be regular (as in sedges). This is an example of radial symmetry. If there is only one plane of symmetry (as in orchids), the flower is said to be irregular. If, in very rare cases, they have no symmetry at all they are called asymmetric. Floral symmetry is a key driver of diversity in flower morphology, because it is one of the main features derived through flower-plant coevolution. Irregular flowers often coevolve with specific pollinators, while radially symmetric flowers tend to attract a wider range of pollinators. (Note: Because animal pollinators are themselves irregular, there is only one comfortable orientation they can have on an irregular flower. Organs can then be arranged to ensure pollen is placed on their bodies in a specific position than ensures pollination of the subsequent flower. Floral symmetry also assists in heat retention, which is required for the growth and effective performance of the floral organs.)

In the majority of species, individual flowers have both female parts and male parts — such flowers are described as being perfect, bisexual, or hermaphrodite. In some species of plants, the flowers are imperfect or unisexual: having only either male or female parts. If unisexual male and female flowers appear on the same plant, the species is called monoecious. However, if an individual plant is either female or male, the species is called dioecious. Many flowers have nectaries, which are glands that produce nectar: a sugary fluid used to attract pollinators. Their shape varies between different plants, are they not considered as an organ on their own.

Some flowers are lacking or have only a highly reduced stalk, and so are attached directly to the plant. There are several structures, found in some plants, that resemble flowers or floral organs. These include: coronas, crown-like outgrowths; and pseudonectaries, that look like nectaries but do not contain nectar. In plants where disease has taken hold, phyllody—leafy flower parts—may occur.

Hermaphrodite flowers have both sexes, monoecious plants have sexes on different flowers, and dioecious plants have either just female or just male flowers.

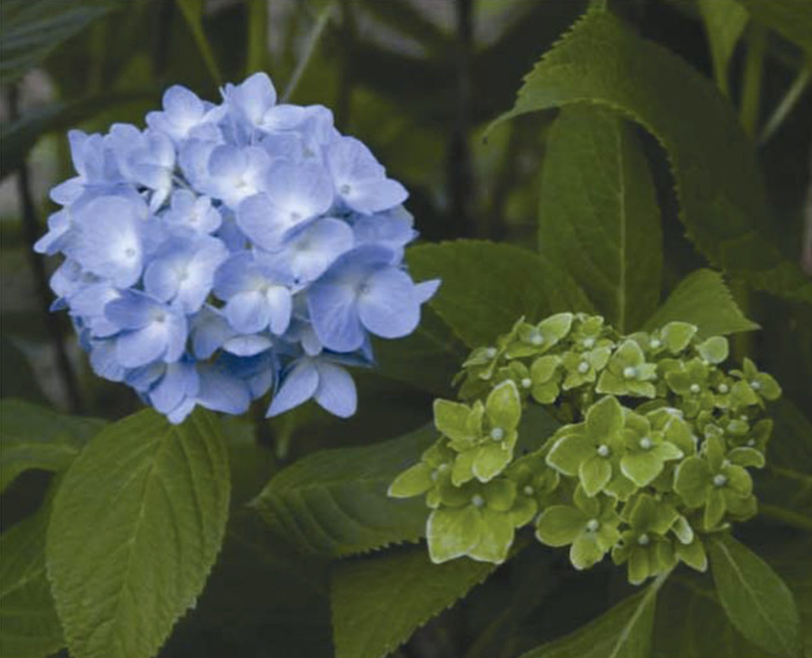
Healthy (left) and infected (right) Hydrangea flower. Phytoplasma has caused the flower to develop leaves in place of petals.

==== Inflorescence ====
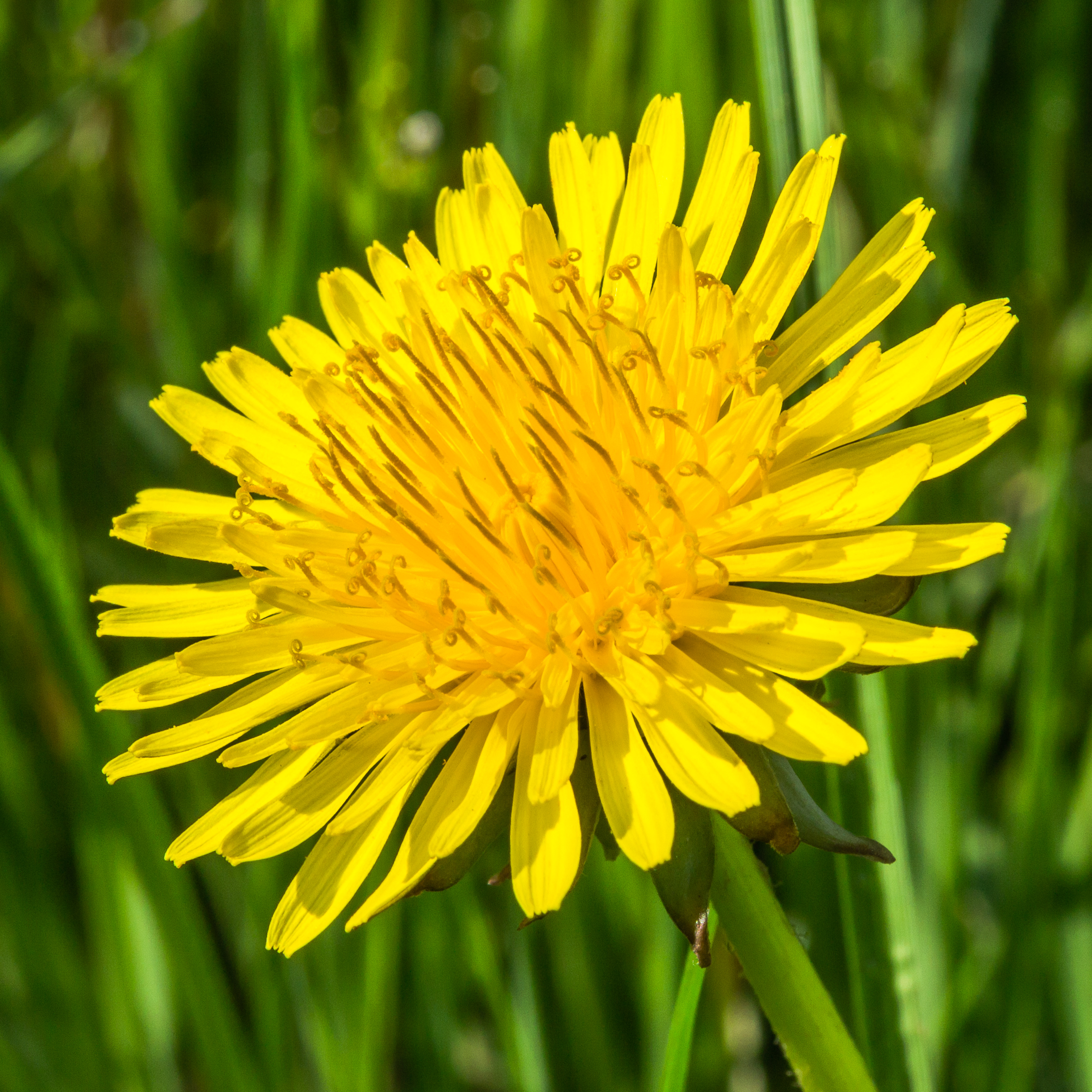
A dandelion inflorescence is made up of many small flowers grouped closely together to look like a single flower (a pseudanthium).

In plants that have more than one flower on an axis, the collective cluster of flowers is called an inflorescence. Some inflorescences are composed of many small flowers arranged in a formation that resembles a single flower. These are known as pseudanthia. A single daisy or sunflower, for example, is not a flower but an inflorescence composed of numerous florets, or tiny flowers. An inflorescence may include specialised stems and modified leaves known called bracts, as well as smaller bracteoles.

=== Floral diagrams and formulae ===
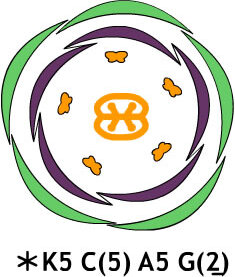
Floral diagram and formula for a Convolvulus (Note: This describes that the flower: (*) is radially symmetric, (K5) has five sepals, (C(5)) has five fused petals, (A5) has five stamens, and (G(2)) has two fused carpels.)

A floral formula is a way to represent the structure of a flower using letters, numbers, and symbols in a compact way. It can represent both a group of species or a particular species, and usually gives ranges for the numbers of different organs. The format of floral formulae differs in different parts of the world, but the formulae all convey the same information.

Floral diagrams are schematic diagrams that can be used to show important features of flowers, including the relative positions of the various organs, the presence of organ fusion and symmetry, and structural details.

=== Colour ===
In contrast to the mostly green vegetative parts of plants, flowers are often colourful. This includes the petals and, in some plants, the stamens, anthers, stigmas, ovaries, pollen, styles, and even nectar. These colours are produced mainly by biological pigments, which are molecules that can absorb and retain energy from light. Specific pigments, and so colours, provide different benefits to the plant. These benefits include protecting the plant against degradation and guiding pollinators—both general and specific—to the plant.

Colour, or colour effects, may also be produced by structural coloration, in which colour is produced by tiny surface structures interfering with waves of light. This includes iridescence (as in some tulips) and photonic crystals (as in edelweiss), which diffract light using tiny grooves. The colour of flowers can also change; sometimes this acts as a signal to pollinators (as in Viola cornuta). Change may also occur as a result of temperature; pH, as in the anthoxanthins found in Hydrangea; metals; sugars; and cell shape.

== Development ==
Floral development begins with the transformation of vegetative growth into floral growth. This is regulated by both genetic and environmental factors. The eventual formation of a flower starts with a shoot apical meristem (SAM): a group of dividing cells responsible for leaves and buds. The organs which make up a flower—in most cases the sepals, petals, male parts, and female parts—grow out of a growth-limited floral meristem, which a SAM creates. The ABC model of flower development can be used, for many plants, to describe how groups of genes come together to induce each organ being produced. In general, all aspects of floral development are controlled by a gene regulatory network of specialised MADS-box genes—which includes the ABC genes—and associated proteins. For plants, the transition into flowering is a major change and must occur at the right time so as to ensure reproductive success. Plants determine this time by interpreting both internal and environmental cues, such as day length.

The ABC model was the first unifying principle in the development of flowers, and its major tenets have been found to hold in most flowering plants. It describes how three groups of genes—A, B, and C—are responsible for the development of flowers. These three gene groups' activities interact together to determine the developmental identities of the primordia organ within the floral apical meristem. Alone, A genes produce sepals in the first whorl. Together, A and B produce the petals in the second whorl. C genes alone produce carpels in the centre of the flower. C and B together produce the stamens in the third whorl. This can also be extended to the more complex ABCDE model, which adds an additional two gene groups to explain the development of structures like ovules.

The transition to flowering is one of the major phase changes that a plant makes during its life cycle. The transition must take place at a time that is favourable for fertilisation and the formation of seeds, hence ensuring maximal reproductive success. To meet these needs a plant can interpret important internal and environmental cues such as: changes in levels of plant hormones (such as gibberellins), seasonable temperature, and day length changes. Many plants, including many of those that have more than two-year lifespans and just two-year lifespans, require cold exposure to flower. These cues are interpreted molecularly through a complex signal called florigen, which involves a variety of genes. Florigen is produced in the leaves in reproductively favourable conditions and acts in stem tips to force switching from developing leaves to flowers. Once developed, flowers may selectively open and close their flowers at different times of day; usually around dusk and dawn. They may also track the path of the sun to remain warm—potentially both for their own benefit and to attract pollinators. Both of these mechanisms are controlled by a plant's circadian rhythm and in response to environmental changes.

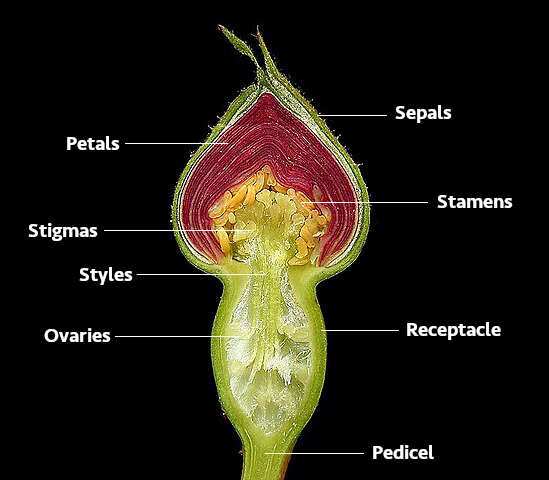
Diagram showing the floral organs within a developing rose flower, or rose bud

Diagram of the ABC model of development

== Pollination ==
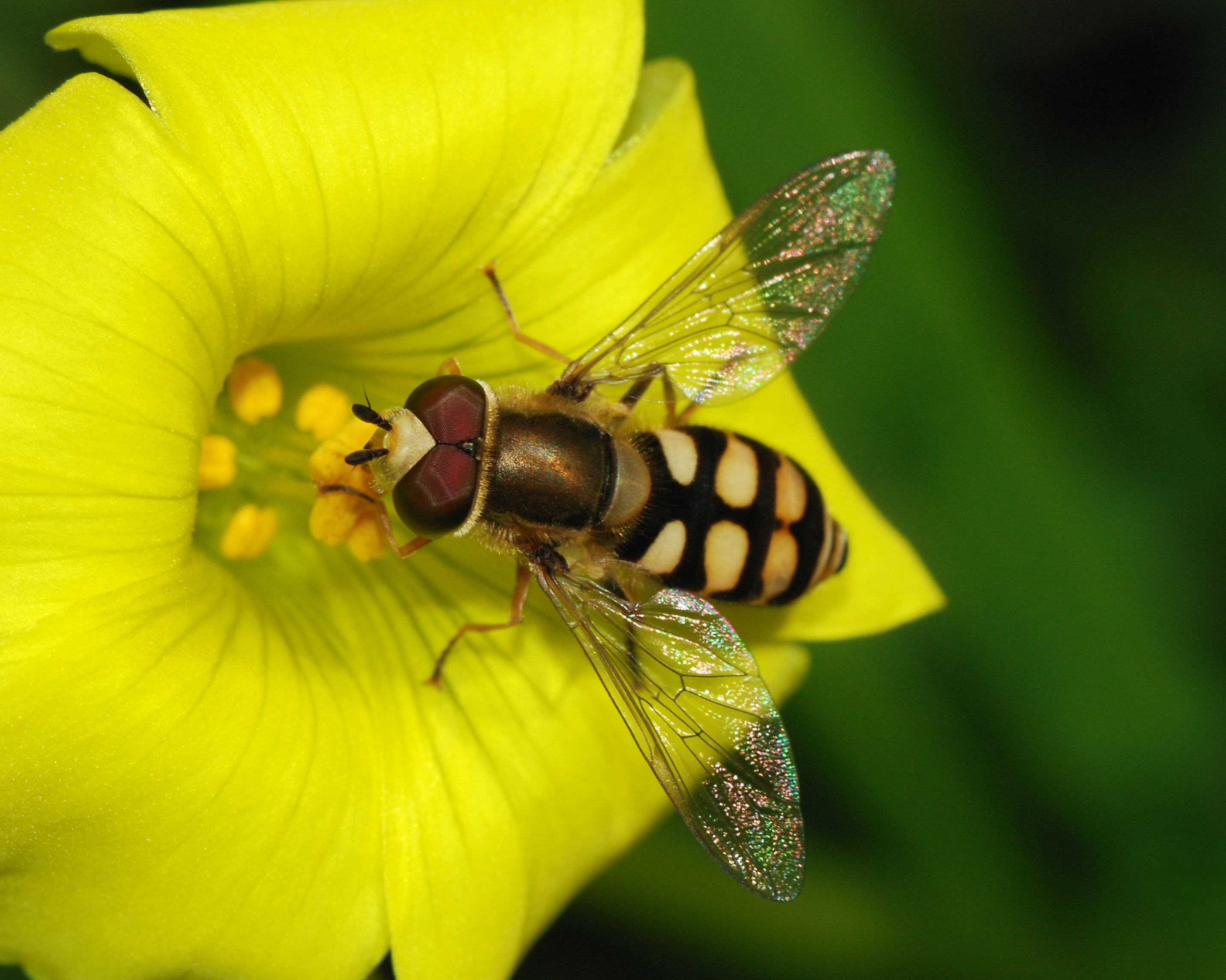
A hoverfly pollinating Oxalis pes-caprae

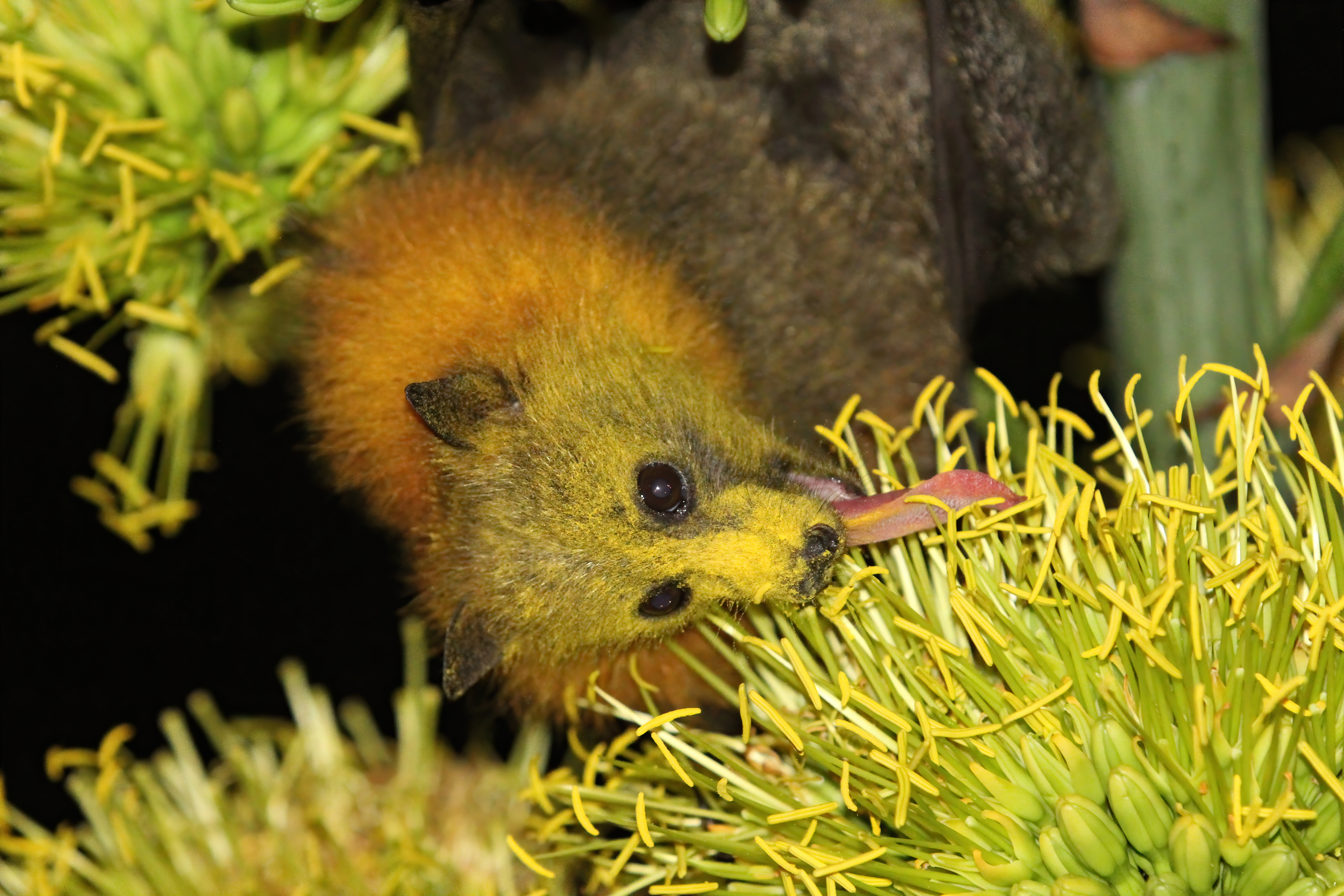
A grey-headed flying fox feeding on nectar

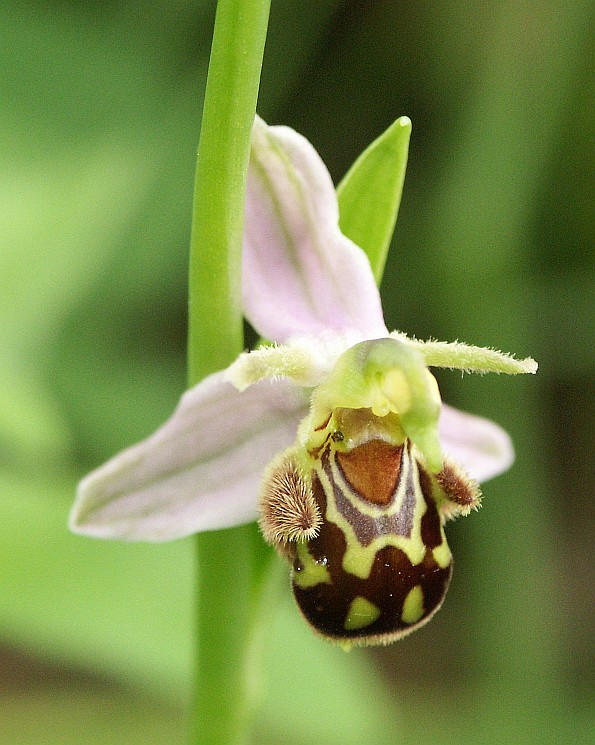
Ophrys apifera, which has evolved to mimic a female bee

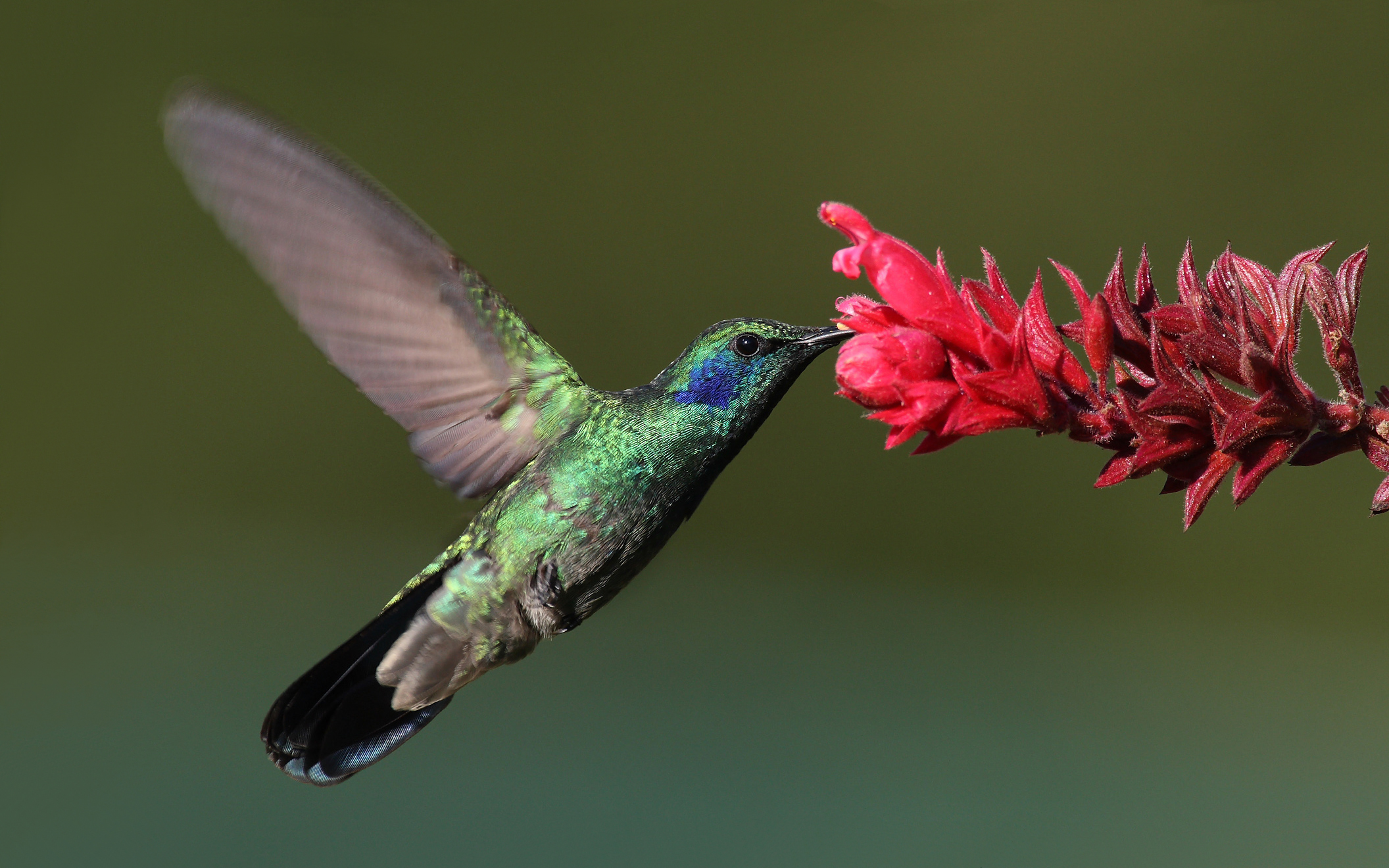
Mexican violetear, Colibri thalassinus, pollinating a flower

Various examples of biotic pollination

Since the flowers are the reproductive organs of the plant, they mediate the joining of the sperm, contained within pollen, to the eggs in the ovules—contained in the ovary. Pollination is this movement of pollen from the male parts to the female parts. It occurs either between flowers (or from one part of a flower to another) of the same plant, as in self-pollination, or between flowers of different plants, as in cross-pollination. Cross-pollination is more common in flowering plants as it increases genetic variation. Pollination typically only takes place when the flower is fully expanded and functional.

Flowering plants usually face evolutionary pressure to optimise the transfer of their pollen, and this is typically reflected in the morphology of their flowers and their reproductive strategies. Agents that transport pollen between plants are called vectors. Around 80% of flowering plants make use of biotic or living vectors. Others use abiotic or non-living vectors, or some combination of the two.

=== Biotic pollination ===
Flowers that use biotic vectors attract and use animals to transfer pollen from one flower to the next. Often they are shaped and designed to both attract pollinators and ensure pollen is transferred effectively. Flowers most commonly employ insects, but also: birds, bats, lizards, other mammals, snails and slugs, and, in rare cases, crustaceans and worms. Rewards given to pollinators by flowers to encourage pollination include: food (such as pollen, starch, or nectar), mates, shelter, a place to raise their young, and pseudocopulation (sexual deception). In the latter, the flower is scented or shaped so as to encourage sexual arousal and pollination from the subsequent intercourse. They may also be attracted by various stimuli such as size and scent (as in carrion flowers). Colour is also a factor, and includes nectar guides, which show pollinators where to look for nectar; they may be visible only under ultraviolet light.

Many flowers have close relationships with just one or a few specific pollinators. They may be structured to allow or encourage pollination from these organisms. This increases efficiency, because there is a higher chance pollination comes from pollen of the same species of plant. This close relationship is an example of coevolution, as the plant and pollinator have developed together over a long period to match each other's needs.

=== Abiotic pollination ===
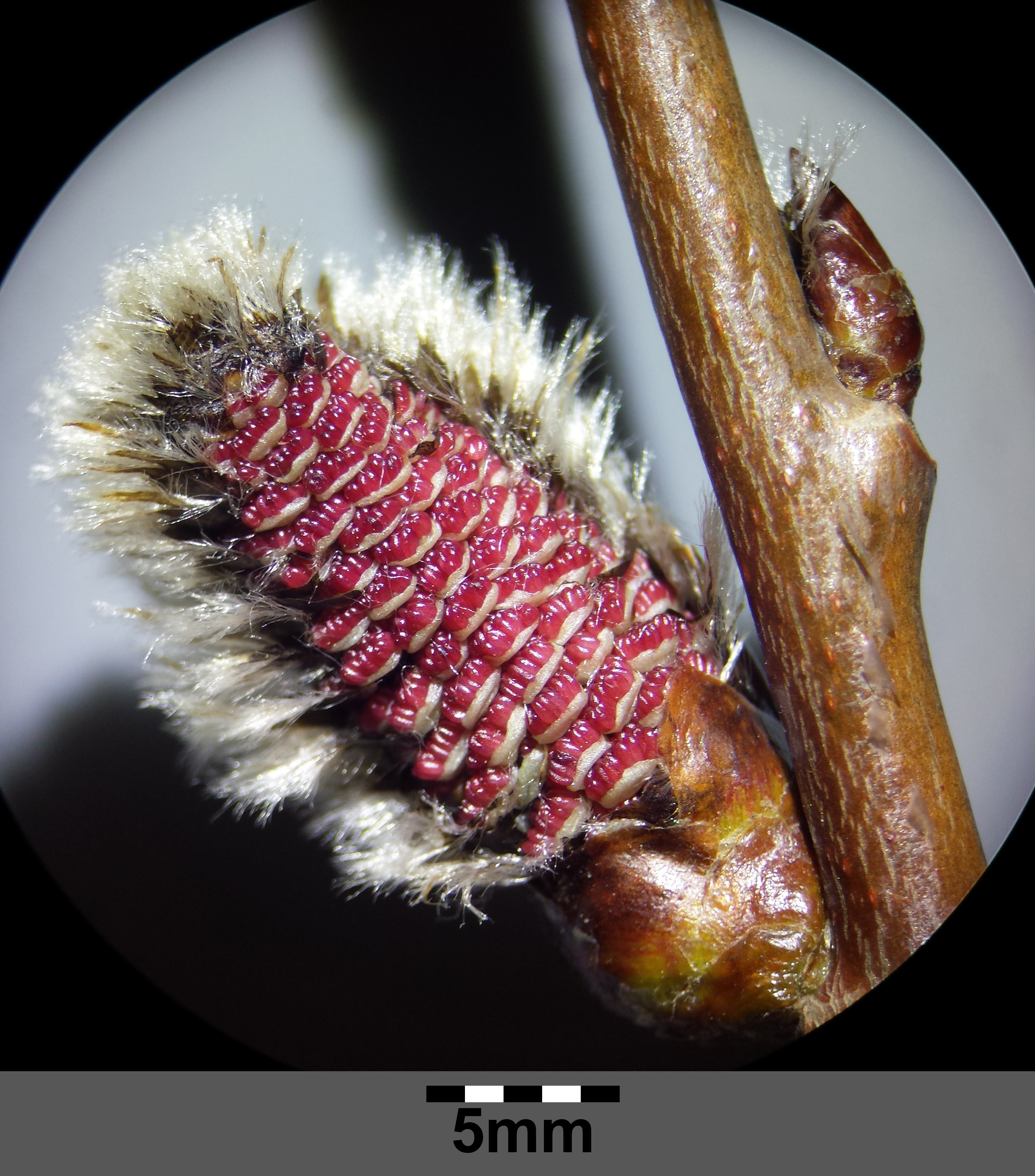
A male catkin, or inflorescence of small wind-pollinated flowers, of Populus tremula

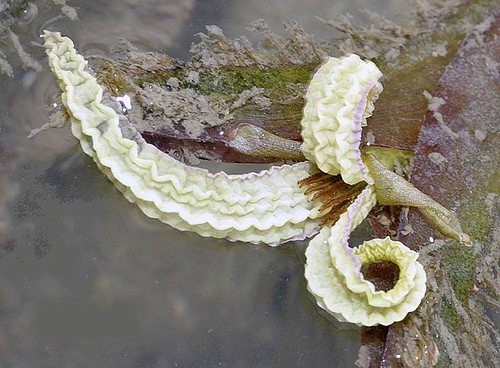
The female flower of Enhalus acoroides, which is pollinated by the flow of water

Flowers that use abiotic, or non-living, vectors use the wind or, much less commonly, water, to move pollen from one flower to the next. Wind-dispersed species do not need to attract pollinators and therefore tend not to grow large, showy, or colourful flowers, and do not have nectaries, nor a noticeable scent. Whereas the pollen of insect-pollinated flowers is usually large, sticky, and rich in protein to act as a "reward", wind-pollinated flowers' pollen is typically small, very light, smooth, and of little nutritional value.

== Fertilisation and seed development ==
A flower's ovules are fertilised by sperm cells from pollen grains.

Fertilisation is the fusion of the male and female sex cells to produce a zygote, from which a new organism develops. In humans, sexual intercourse results in the depositing of sperm cells into the vagina. Although not all survive, they travel until one reaches the egg in the fallopian tube, where the male and female sex cells fuse in the process of fertilisation.

In flowering plants, fertilisation is preceded by pollination, which is the movement of pollen from the stamen to the carpel. It encompasses both plasmogamy, the fusion of the protoplasts (cell without cell wall), and karyogamy, the fusion of the nuclei. When pollen lands on the stigma of the flower it begins creating a pollen tube, which runs down through the style and into the ovary. After penetrating the centre-most part of the ovary it enters the egg apparatus and is guided by a specialised cell.

Next, the end of the pollen tube bursts and releases the two sperm cells, one of which makes its way to an egg, while also losing its cell membrane and much of the jelly-like substance that fills its cells. The sperm's nucleus then fuses with the egg's nucleus, resulting in the formation of a zygote; a diploid cell, containing two copies of each chromosome. Flowering plants undergo double fertilisation, which involves both karyogamy and plasmogamy. In double fertilisation the second sperm cell subsequently also fuses with the two polar nuclei of the central cell. Since all three nuclei are haploid, they result in a large nutrient tissue nucleus which is triploid.

=== Seed and fruit development ===
Development of seeds (peas) and fruit (pod) from pea flower

Following its formation, the zygote begins to grow through nuclear and cellular divisions, called mitosis, eventually becoming a small group of cells. One section of it becomes the embryo, while the other becomes the suspensor; a structure which forces the embryo into the endosperm and is later undetectable. Two small groups of cells also form at this time, which later become the cotyledon, or initial leaf, which is used as an energy store. The next stage involves the growth of several key structures, including: the embryotic root, the embryotic stem, and the root or shoot junction itself. In the final step, vascular tissue develops around the seed.

The ovary, inside which the seed is forming from the ovule, grows into a fruit. All the other main floral parts wither and die during this development, including: the style, stigma, stamens, petals, and sepals. This process is called floral senescence; it is often accelerated or initiated by the completion of pollination. Death is preferred because flowers are costly to the plant; nevertheless, flowers can last for between a few hours and several months. The fruit contains three main structures: the outer layer of peel; the fleshy part; and the stone, or innermost layer. The pericarp, which may include one or more of these structures, represents collectively the fruit wall—everything but the seed. The size, shape, toughness, and thickness of the pericarp varies among different dry and fleshy fruits. These traits are directly connected to the plant's method of seed dispersal, since the purpose of fruit is to encourage or enable the seed's dispersal and protect the seed while doing so.

=== Seed dispersal ===
Following the pollination of a flower, fertilisation, and finally the development of a seed and fruit, a mechanism, or vector, is typically used to disperse the fruit away from the plant. In flowering plants, seeds are dispersed away from the plant so as to not force competition between the mother and daughter plants, as well as to enable the colonisation of new areas. Vectors can generally be divided into two categories: external vectors and internal vectors. External vectors include living things like birds or bats, or non-living things such as water and wind. Internal vectors, which are derived from the plant itself, include, for example, the fruit exploding to release the seeds, as in dwarf mistletoes.

== Evolution ==
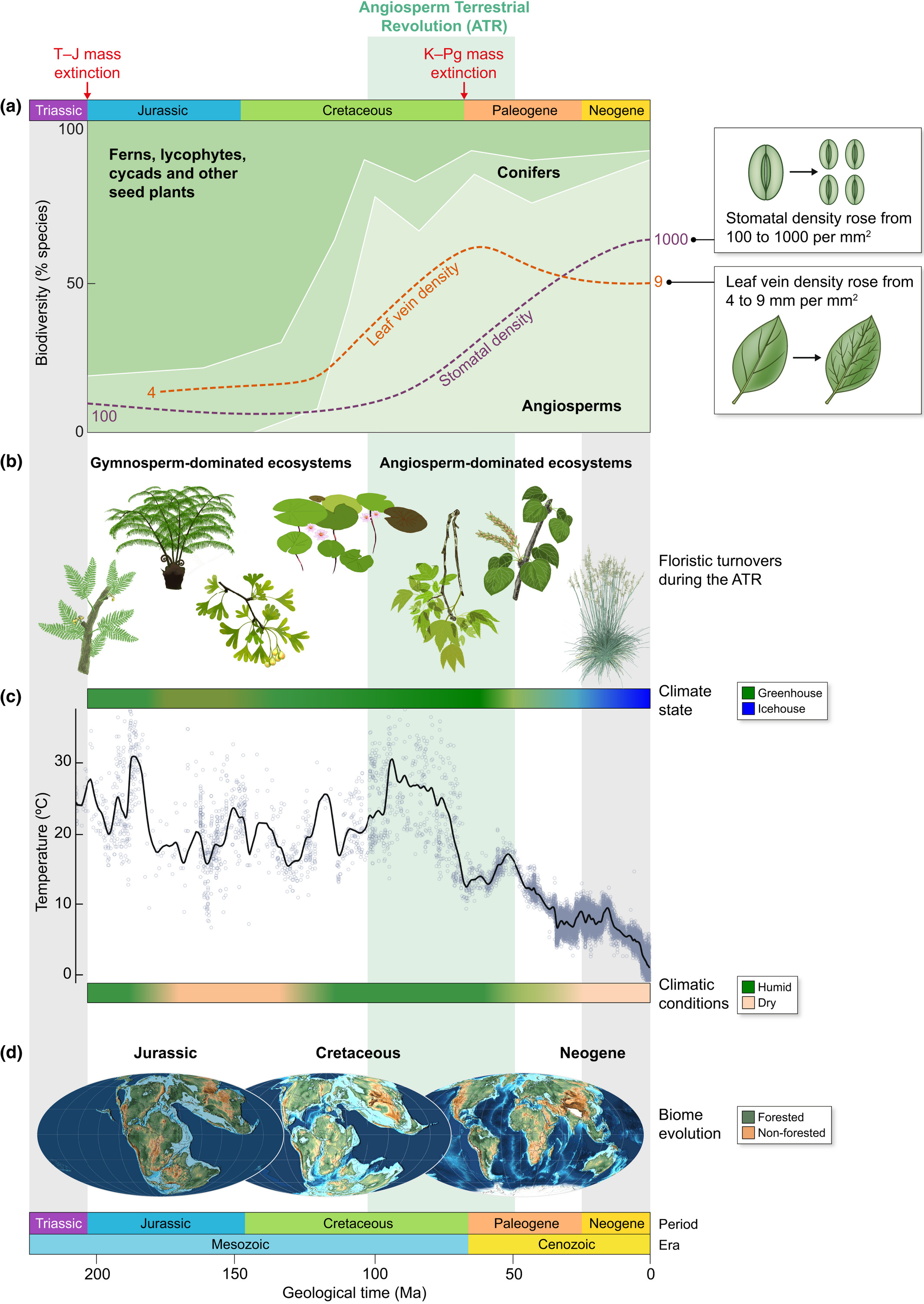
Angiosperms now account for most of land plant diversity, thanks in large part to flowers.

Flowers originated between 150 and 190 million years ago, during the Jurassic. Although molecular analyses indicate this early appearance of angiosperms—flowering plants, the earliest definitive evidence from the fossil record comes from between 125 and 130 million years ago, during the Early Cretaceous. (Note: One such early flower is Archaefructus liaoningensis from China; dated to around 125 million years old. Even earlier from China is the 125–130 million years old Archaefructus sinensis. In 2015 Montsechia vidalii, discovered in Spain, was claimed to be 130 million years old.) The exact time at which angiosperms diverged from other seed plants is a classic open question in evolutionary biology. Prior to the advent of flowers, plants reproduced using cones (as in gymnosperms), and spores (as in pteridophytes). The transformation of spore-producing leaves into structures like stamens and carpels, is the most clear milestone in the complex evolution of flowers. There is debate both over whether these and other changes happened gradually or as sudden shifts like homeotic mutations, and which aspect of flower morphology came first.

The flower was the angiosperms' most significant evolutionary innovation, granting the ability to effectively take advantage of animal pollinators. Other evolutionary advantages included: being able to have both male and female parts on the same axis; and on this axis have carpels, to protect the ovules; stamens, to present the pollen; and the perianth, to provide protection. In addition, they pioneered double fertilisation, which allows energy investment (into endosperm) to be prolonged until after pollination. The gametophytes, which lead to sex cells, were very reduced, which allowed for greater protection of this critical process. The net effect of these features was greater reproductive security and efficiency. This allowed the angiosperms to replace many other seed plants—such as Pinales, cycads, Gnetophyta and Ginkgoales—in the majority of ecosystems.

A key driving force in the evolution of flowers is coevolution, where pollinator and flower evolve with one another, often to their mutual benefit. This is particularly prominent in insect species such as bees, but is also found in flower-pollinator relationships with birds and bats. Many flowers have evolved in such a way so as to make pollination by specific species easier, thus providing greater efficiency and also ensuring higher rates of pollination. This is because they receive less pollen from other plant species. However, this close interdependence increases the risk of extinction, since the extinction of either member almost certainly means the extinction of the other member as well. Modern-day flowers exhibit a variety of features derived through coevolution including: shape, size, symmetry, timing of flower opening, colour, scent, and pollinator rewards (including pollen, nectar, and oils). For example, Japanese honeysuckle flowers strategically open during the night to attract nocturnal moths, which are more efficient pollinators than diurnal bees. With the innovation of the flower—and other adaptations—angiosperms rapidly diversified. (Note: These other adaptions include greater density of leaf veins and stomata; smaller genome size, leading to smaller cells; higher rates of photosynthesis; and vessels connected to the xylem.) Approximately 90% of all living land plant species are angiosperms. This is attributed, in part, to coevolution, which caused specialisation and so speciation; where populations diverge into separate species. Both the strength of close pollinator-flower relationships and the survival of either species are affected by climate change. Reducing numbers of pollinators have led to the extinction of many flowering plants.

== Taxonomy ==
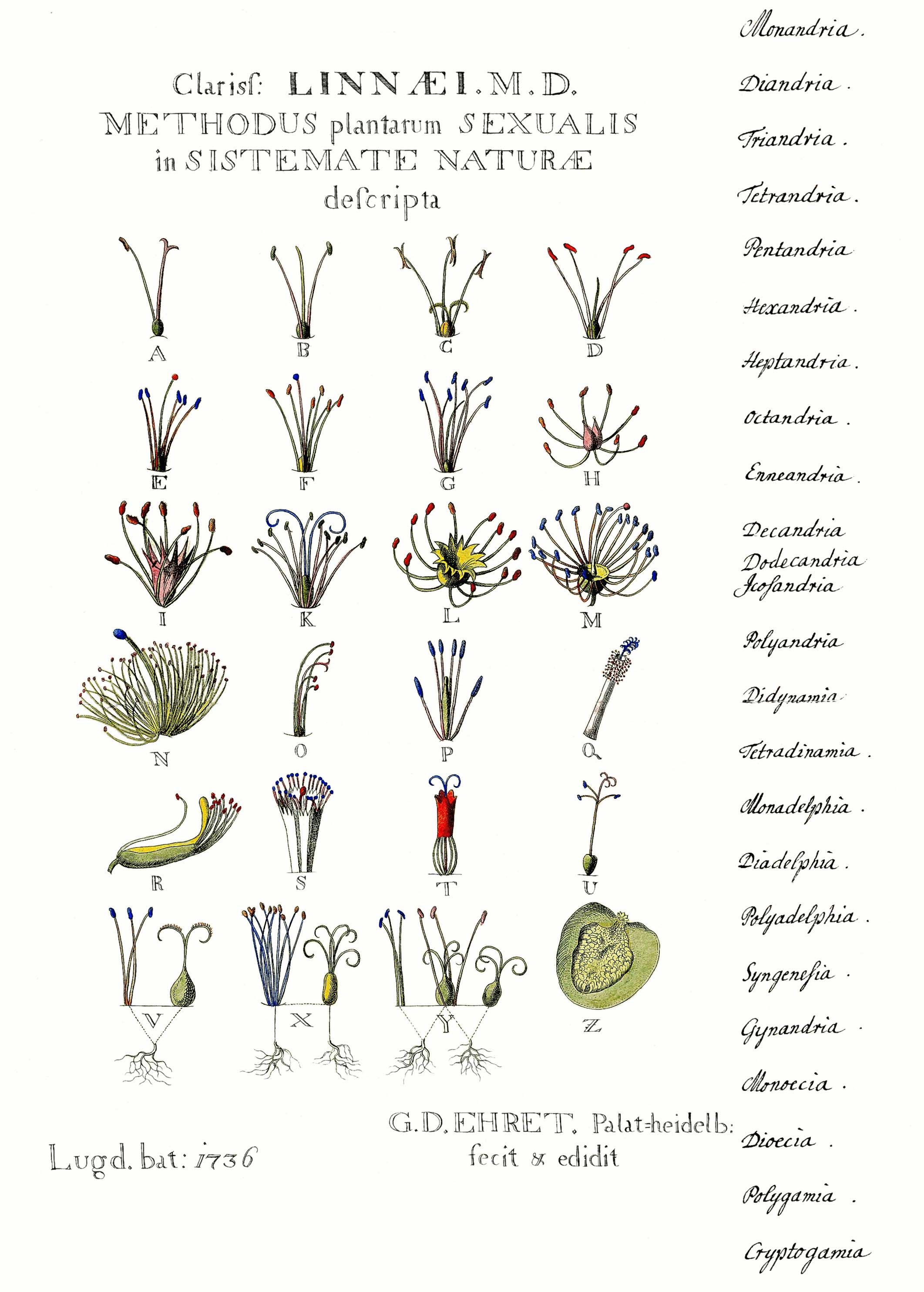
Linnaeus's diagram of 24 classes of sexual systems, from Systema Naturae

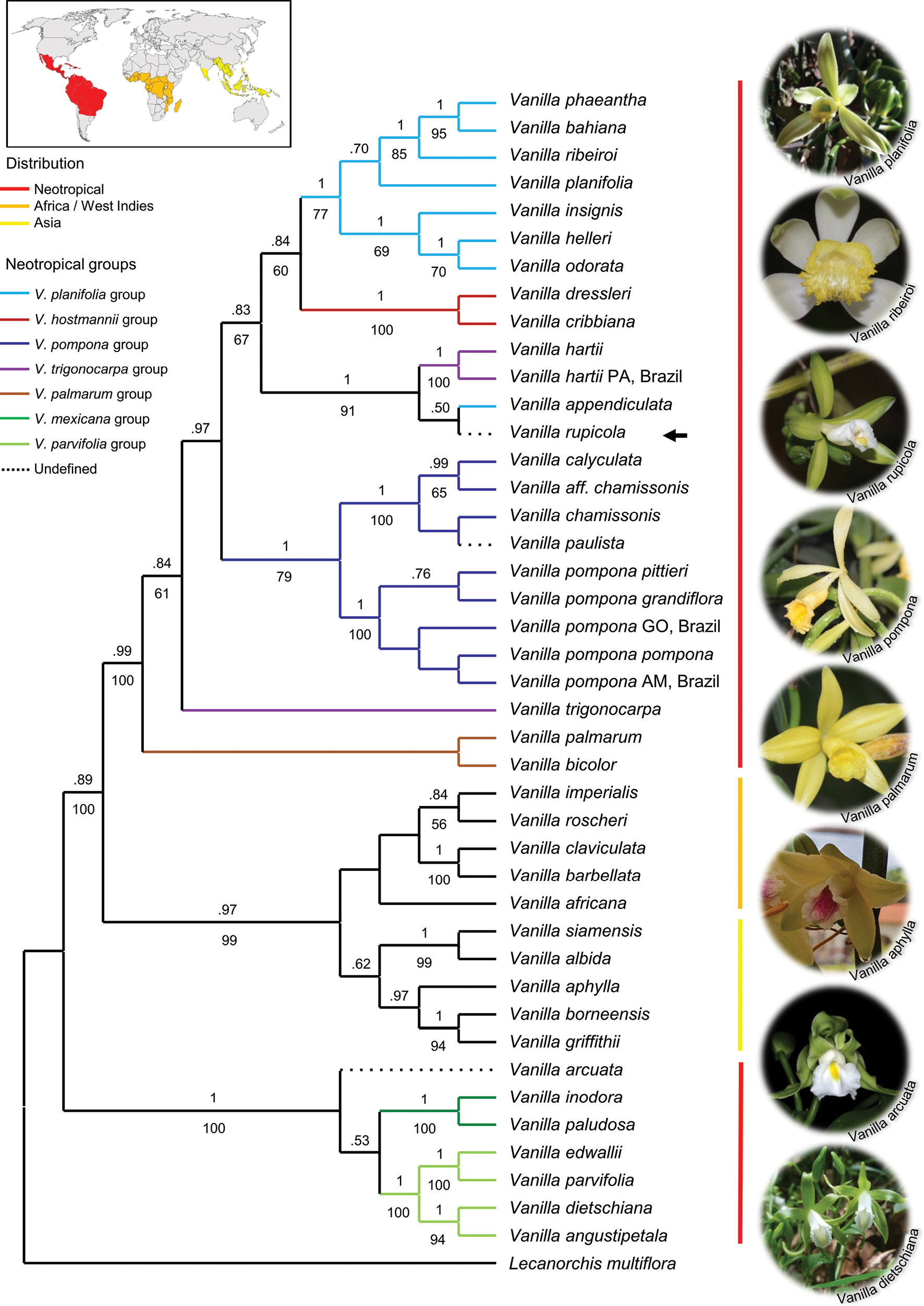
Maximum likelihood diagram of a phylogenetic tree of orchids in the genus Vanilla

Classical and modern approaches to angiosperm taxonomy

In plant taxonomy, which is the study of plant classification and identification, the morphology of plants' flowers is used extensively—and has been since at least classical Greece. Despite earlier works, Carl Linnaeus's 1753 book Species Plantarum, in which he laid out his system of classification, is regarded as the first taxonomic work to recognise the significance of flowers. He identified 24 classes of flowering plants, based mainly on the number, length, and union of the stamens. Subsequent systems in the 18th and 19th centuries focused more on natural characteristics. This included taking into account the rest of the plant, so that diverse plants weren't put into the same groups, as often happened in Linnaeus's system.

In 1963, the biologists Robert Sokal and Peter Sneath created the method of numerical taxonomy, which differentiates taxa based on their tabulated morphological characteristics; such as their flowers. This was an effort to make plant taxonomy more objective, but it remained inconsiderate of evolution, and so not useful in that context. While this and earlier methods, such as Linnaeus's, used morphological features, many botanists today employ genetic sequencing, the study of cells, and the study of pollen. These come as a result of advancements in DNA-related science. Despite this, morphological characteristics such as the nature of the flower and inflorescence still make up the bedrock of plant taxonomy.

== Uses ==
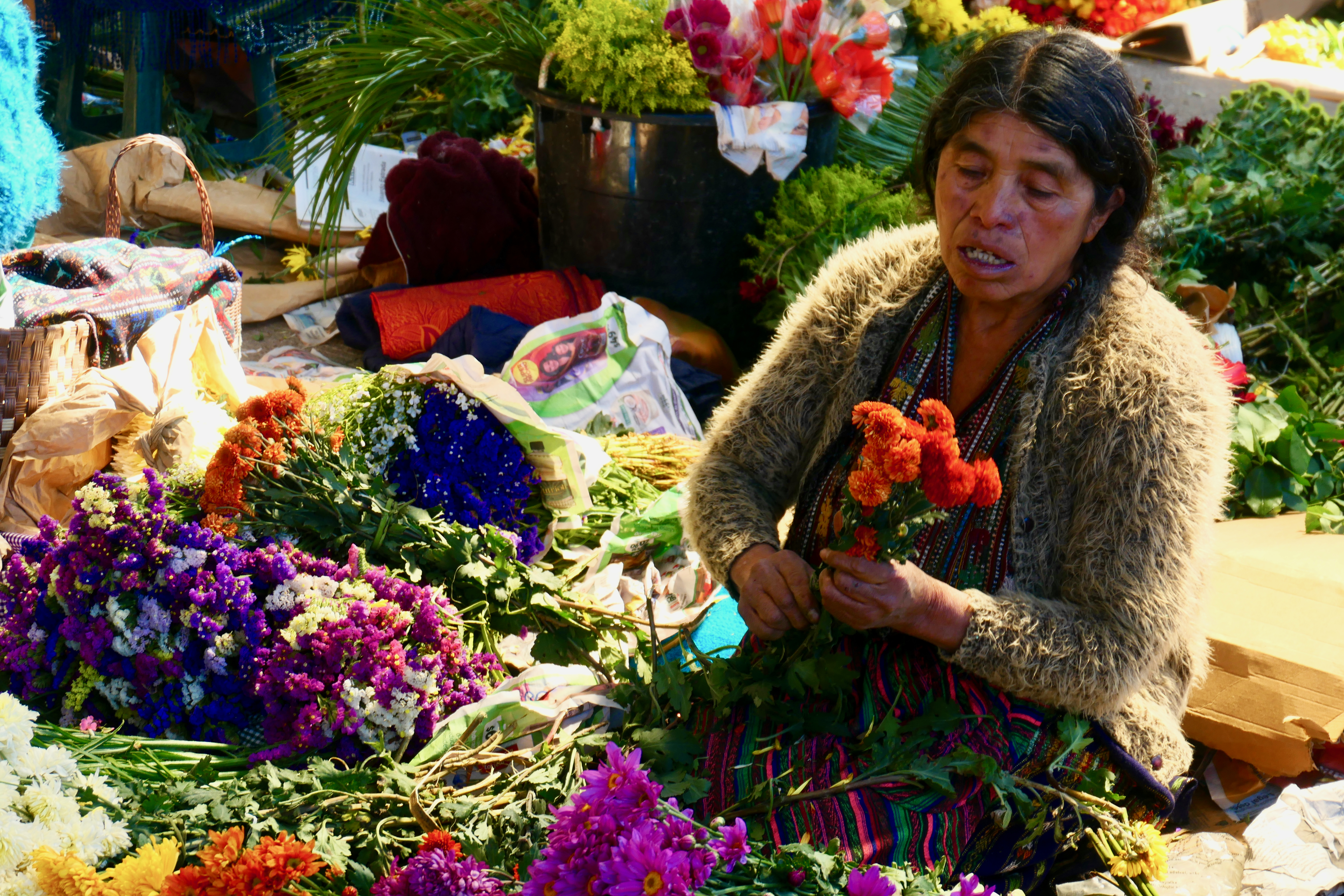
Flower market in Guatemala

Over millennia, humans have come to use flowers for a variety of purposes around the world, including decoration, medicine, drugs, food, spices, perfumes, and essential oils. Many flowers are edible and are often used in drinks and dishes, such as salads, for taste, scent, and decoration. Inflorescences and the bracts or stems of some flowers are commonly described as vegetables. These include: broccoli, cauliflower, and artichoke. Flowers may be eaten freshly after being picked, or dried and eaten later. Floristry is the production and sale of flowers, and involves preparing freshly cut flowers and arranging them—in a bouquet, for example—to the client's liking.

Most crop plants have flowers, and they produce much of the most common crop products—such as seeds and fruits; around half of all cropland is used to grow three flowering plants: rice, wheat, and corn. Flowers are steeped to make teas, either alone, as in herbal teas, or in combination with the tea plant. Essential oils and other flower extracts are widely used in herbal medicines and decoctions because they contain phytochemicals and may have anti-microbial effects. Flowers from many plants are also used in the production of drugs, such as cannabis, bush lily, and Madagascar periwinkle. Some flowers are used in cooking as spices, these include saffron and cloves; derived from Crocus and Syzygium aromaticum respectively.

== In culture ==
I know a bank where the wild thyme blows,
Where oxlips and the nodding violet grows,
Quite over-canopied with luscious woodbine,
With sweet musk-roses and with eglantine:
There sleeps Titania sometime of the night,
Lull'd in these flowers with dances and delight;

— Poets often invoke floral imagery, as in this excerpt from Shakespeare's A Midsummer Night's Dream

Flowers are the subject of much symbolism, and feature often in art, ritual, religious practices, and festivals. Plants have been cultivated in gardens for their flowers for around ten thousand years. Flowers are associated with burial in many cultures, and are often placed by headstones to pay respect. They are also placed by statues or temples of religious or other figures—sometimes formed into floral wreaths. In some places, the dead are buried covered in flowers or on a bed of flowers. They are also associated with love and celebration, and given to others in many places for this reason. Economic demand has led to the cultivation of flowers that are longer-lasting, more colourful, and visually appealing.

Flowers feature extensively in art across a variety of mediums, and different flowers are ascribed symbolic meanings. For example, violets may represent modesty, virtue, or affection. In addition to hidden meanings, flowers are used in flags, emblems, and seals. In this way, they represent countries or places. Some countries have national flowers; for example, Hibiscus × rosa-sinensis is the national flower of Malaysia. In literature, flowers feature in imagery of places and as metaphors for pleasure, beauty, and life.

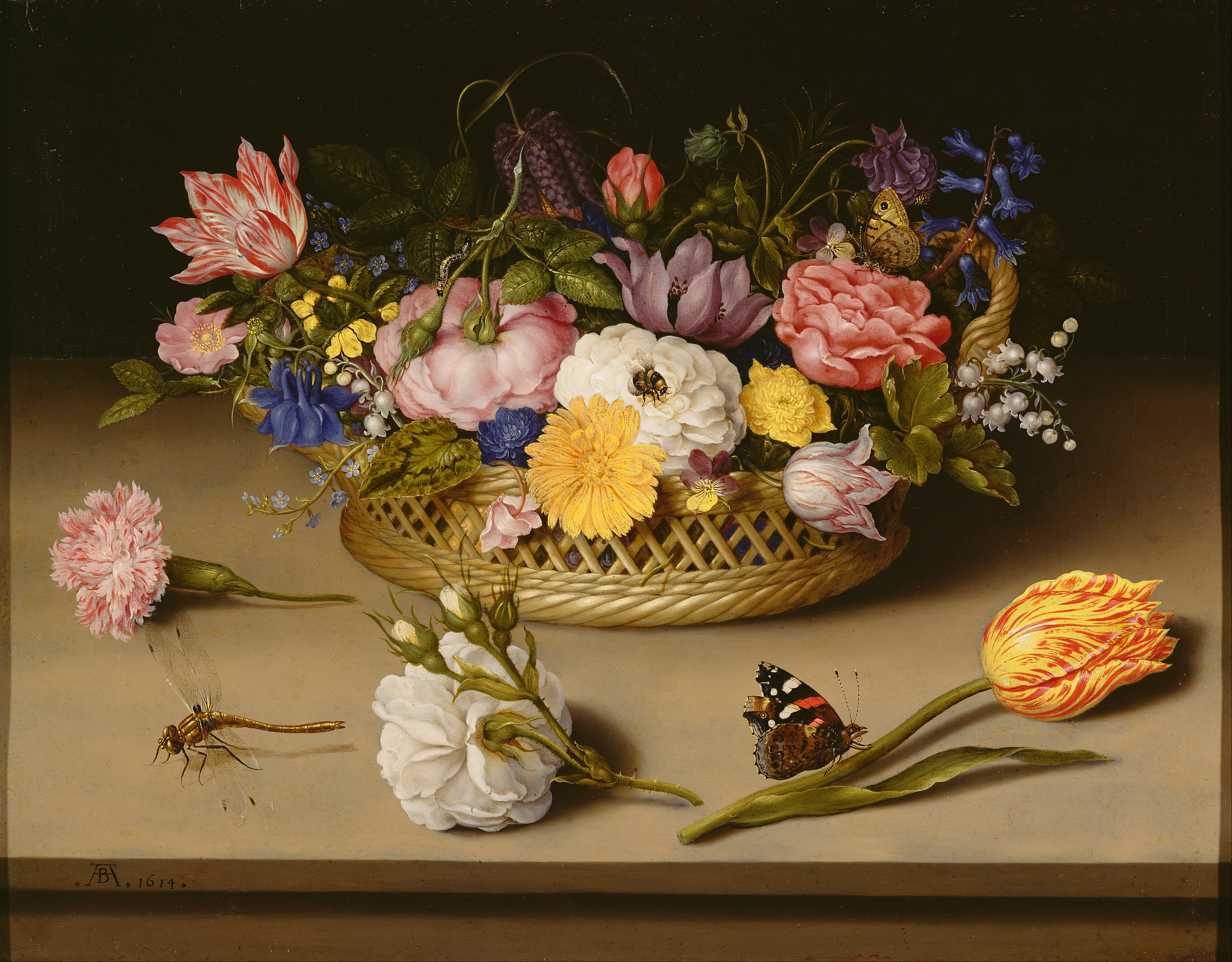
Still life of flowers by Ambrosius Bosschaert, 1614

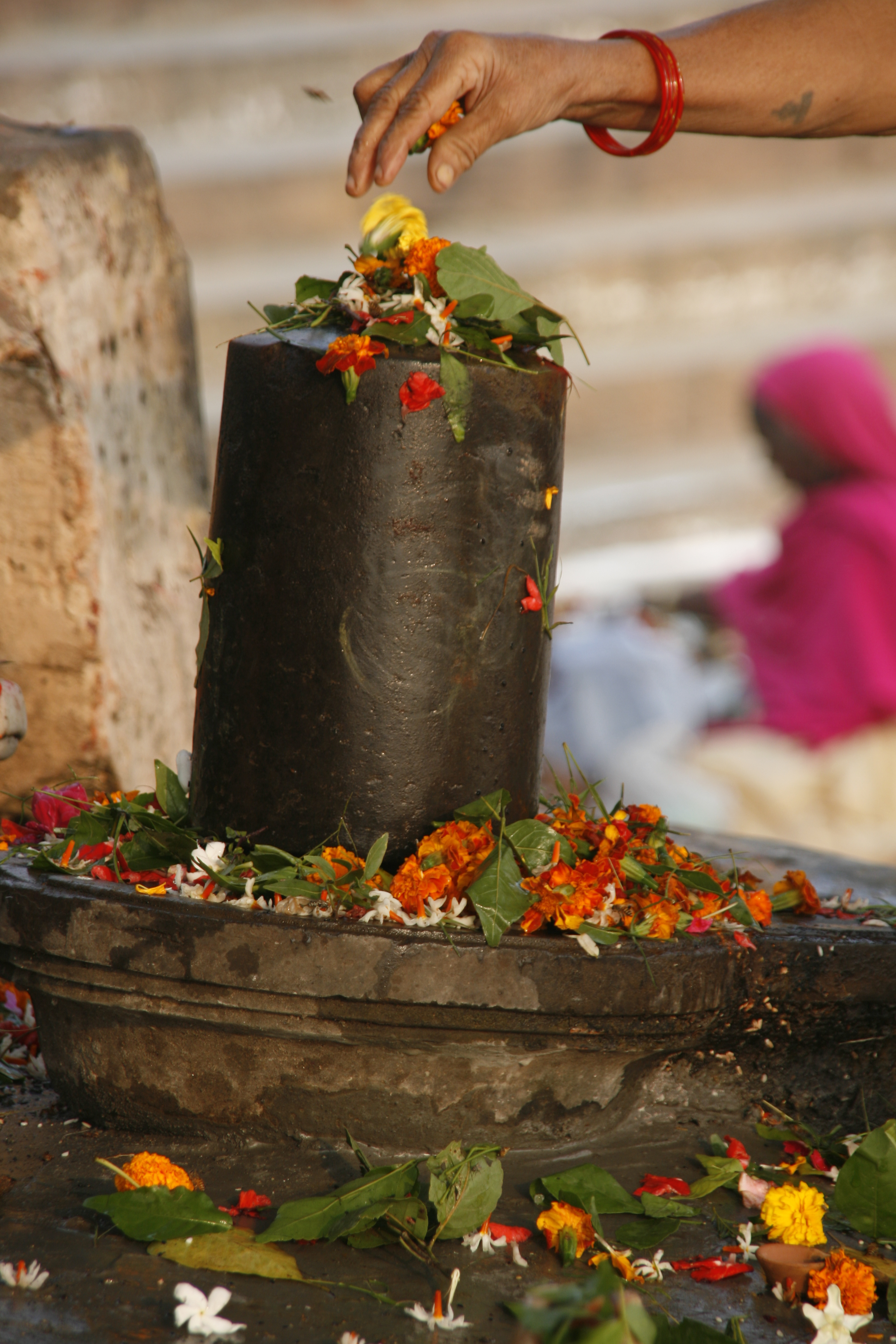
A woman spreading flowers over a lingam

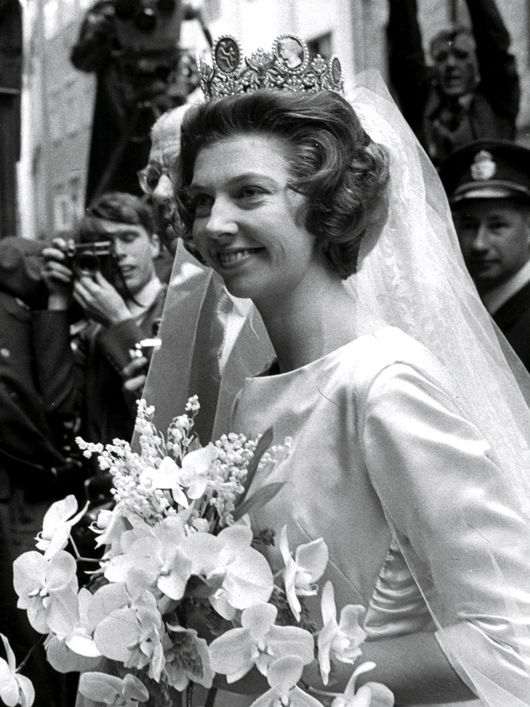
Princess Désirée of Sweden carrying flowers at her wedding

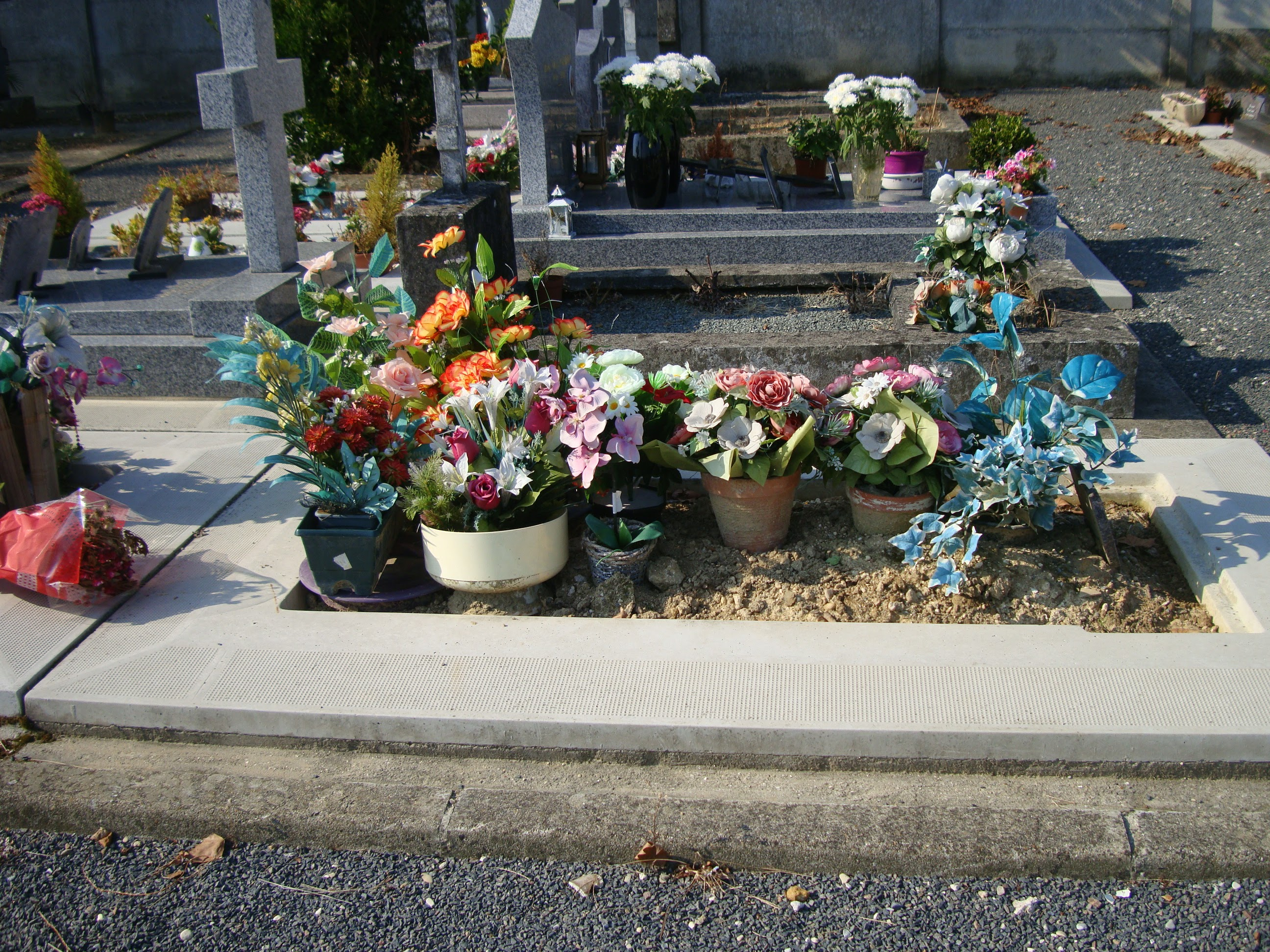
Flowers placed on a grave

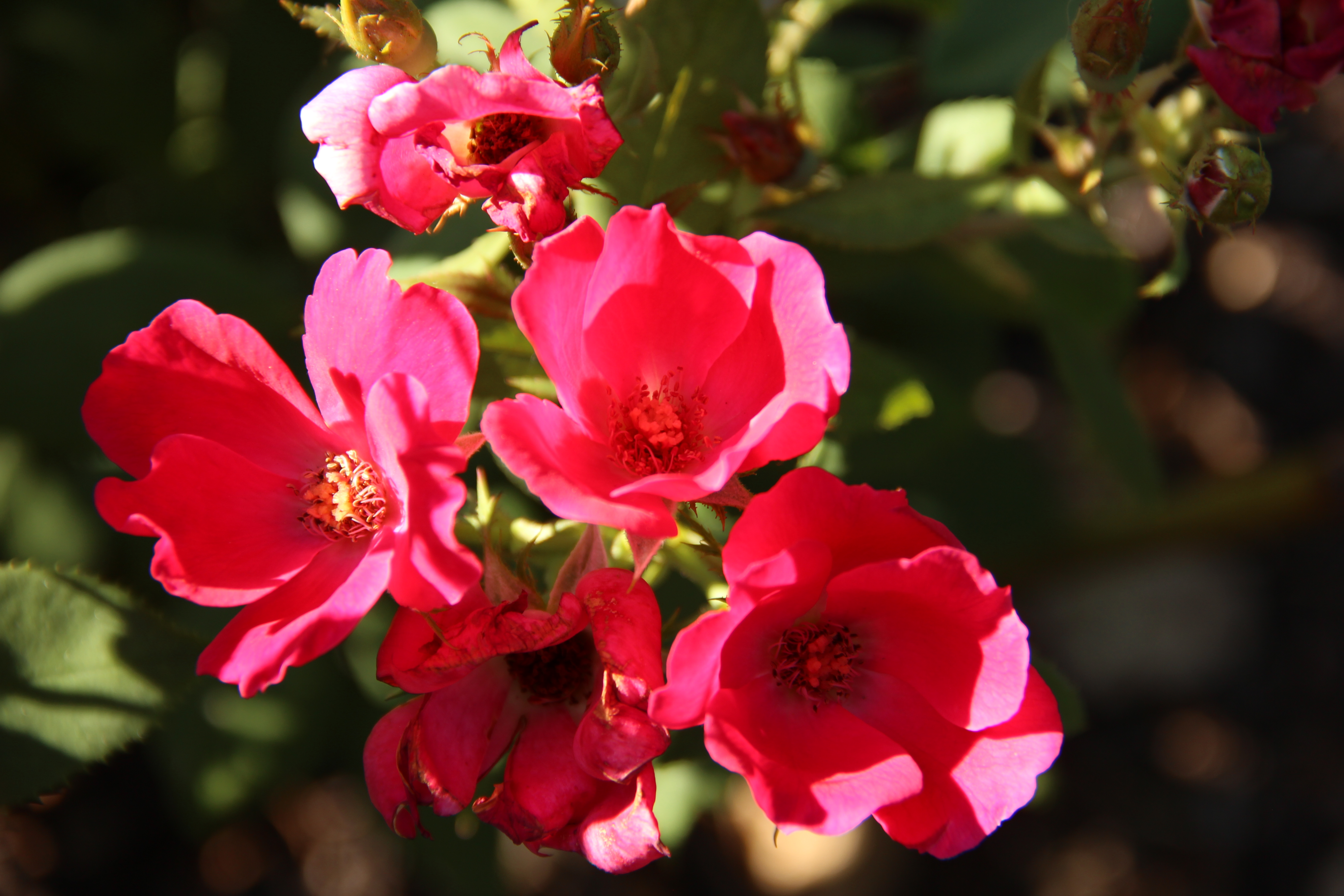
Floral photography

== Bibliography ==
- Ackerman, J. D. (2000). "Abiotic pollen and pollination: ecological, functional, and evolutionary perspectives". Plant Systematics and Evolution. 222 (1): 167–185. Bibcode:2000PSyEv.222..167A. doi:10.1007/BF00984101.
- Armbruster, W. Scott (2014). "Floral specialization and angiosperm diversity: phenotypic divergence, fitness trade-offs and realized pollination accuracy". AoB Plants. 6. doi:10.1093/aobpla/plu003. PMC 4038416. PMID 24790124.
- Atamian, Hagop S.; Creux, Nicky M.; Brown, Robin Isadora; Garner, Austin G.; Blackman, Benjamin K.; Harmer, Stacey L. (2016). "Circadian regulation of sunflower heliotropism, floral orientation, and pollinator visits". Science. 353 (6299): 587–590. Bibcode:2016Sci...353..587A. doi:10.1126/science.aaf9793. PMID 27493185.
- Ausín, Israel; Alonso-Blanco, Carlos; Martínez-Zapater, José-Miguel (2005). "Environmental regulation of flowering". Int J Dev Biol. 49 (5–6): 689–705. doi:10.1387/ijdb.052022ia. PMID 16096975.
- Baczyński, Jakub; Claßen-Bockhoff, Regine (2023). "Pseudanthia in angiosperms: a review". Annals of Botany. 132 (2): 179–202. doi:10.1093/aob/mcad103. PMC 10583202. PMID 37478306.
- Bawa, K. S. (1990). "Plant-pollinator interactions in tropical rain forests". Annual Review of Ecology and Systematics. 21 (1): 399–422. Bibcode:1990AnRES..21..399B. doi:10.1146/annurev.es.21.110190.002151. JSTOR 2097031.
- Becker, Annette; Alix, Karine; Damerval, Catherine (2011). "The evolution of flower development: current understanding and future challenges". Annals of Botany. 107 (9): 1427–1431. doi:10.1093/aob/mcr122. PMC 3108812. PMID 21793247.
- Beekman, Madeleine; Nieuwenhuis, Bart; Ortiz-Barrientos, Daniel; Evans, Jonathan P. (2016). "Sexual selection in hermaphrodites, sperm and broadcast spawners, plants and fungi". Philosophical Transactions: Biological Sciences. 371 (1706): 1–13. doi:10.1098/rstb.2015.0541. JSTOR 26143395. PMC 5031625. PMID 27619704.
- Benton, Michael J.; Wilf, Peter; Sauquet, Hervé (2022). "The angiosperm terrestrial revolution and the origins of modern biodiversity". New Phytologist. 233 (5): 2017–2035. Bibcode:2022NewPh.233.2017B. doi:10.1111/nph.17822. hdl:1983/82a09075-31f4-423e-98b9-3bb2c215e04b. PMID 34699613.
- Bowler, Diana E.; Benton, Tim G. (2005). "Causes and consequences of animal dispersal strategies: relating individual behaviour to spatial dynamics". Biological Reviews of the Cambridge Philosophical Society. 80 (2): 205–225. Bibcode:2005BioRv..80..205B. doi:10.1017/S1464793104006645. PMID 15921049.
- Buchmann, Stephen L. (2016). The reason for flowers: their history, culture, biology, and how they change our lives (1st ed.). Scribner. ISBN 978-1-4767-5552-6.
- Castel, Baptiste; El Mahboubi, Karima; Jacquet, Christophe; Delaux, Pierre-Marc (2024). "Immunobiodiversity: conserved and specific immunity across land plants and beyond". Molecular Plant. 17 (1): 92–111. Bibcode:2024MPlan..17...92C. doi:10.1016/j.molp.2023.12.005. PMID 38102829.
- Chanderbali, Andre S; Berger, Brent A; Howarth, Dianella G; Soltis, Pamela S; Soltis, Douglas E (2016). "Evolving ideas on the origin and evolution of flowers: new perspectives in the genomic era". Genetics. 202 (4): 1255–1265. Bibcode:2016Genet.202.1255C. doi:10.1534/genetics.115.182964. PMC 4905540. PMID 27053123.
- Chauhan, Avnish; Chauhan, Manya; Sethi, Muneesh; Bodhe, Arvind; Tomar, Anirudh; Shikha; Singh, Nitesh (2024). "Application of flower wastes to produce valuable products". In Srivastav, Arun Lal; Bhardwaj, Abhishek Kumar; Kumar, Mukesh (eds.). Valorization of biomass wastes for environmental sustainability: green practices for the rural circular economy. Cham: Springer Nature Switzerland. pp. 251–268. doi:10.1007/978-3-031-52485-1_14. ISBN 978-3-031-52485-1.
- Coyago-Cruz, Elena; Moya, Melany; Méndez, Gabriela; Villacís, Michael; Rojas-Silva, Patricio; Corell, Mireia; Mapelli-Brahm, Paula; Vicario, Isabel M.; Meléndez-Martínez, Antonio J. (2023). "Exploring Plants with Flowers: From Therapeutic Nutritional Benefits to Innovative Sustainable Uses". Foods. 12 (22): 4066. doi:10.3390/foods12224066. PMC 10671036. PMID 38002124.
- Cresswell, Julia (2010). Oxford dictionary of word origins. Oxford University Press. ISBN 978-0-19-954793-7 – via the Internet Archive.
- De Craene, Louis P. Ronse (2010). Floral diagrams. Cambridge University Press. doi:10.1017/cbo9780511806711. ISBN 978-0-511-80671-1.
- Delaney, Sara; von Wettberg, Eric J. B. (2023). "Toward the next angiosperm revolution: agroecological food production as a driver for biological diversity". Elementa: Science of the Anthropocene. 11 (1): 00134. Bibcode:2023EleSA..11..134D. doi:10.1525/elementa.2022.00134.
- Dellinger, Agnes S. (2020). "Pollination syndromes in the 21st century: where do we stand and where may we go?". New Phytologist. 228 (4): 1193–1213. doi:10.1111/nph.16793. PMID 33460152.
- Delpeuch, Pauline; Jabbour, Florian; Damerval, Catherine; Schönenberger, Jürg; Pamperl, Susanne; Rome, Maxime; Nadot, Sophie (2022). "A flat petal as ancestral state for Ranunculaceae". Frontiers in Plant Science. 13 961906. Bibcode:2022FrPS...1361906D. doi:10.3389/fpls.2022.961906. PMC 9532948. PMID 36212342.
- de Vaan, Michiel (2008). Etymological dictionary of Latin and the other Italic languages. Brill. ISBN 978-90-04-16797-1.
- Eames, A. J. (1961). Morphology of the angiosperms. McGraw-Hill Book Co. LCCN 60015757.
- Endress, Peter K. (1996). Diversity and evolutionary biology of tropical flowers. Cambridge University Press. ISBN 0-521-42088-1.
- Feng, Hui-Hui; Wang, Xiao-Yue; Luo, Yi-Bo; Huang, Shuang-Quan (2023). "Floral scent emission is the highest at the second night of anthesis in Lonicera japonica (Caprifoliaceae)". Journal of Systematics and Evolution. 61 (3): 530–537. Bibcode:2023JSyEv..61..530F. doi:10.1111/jse.12916.
- Forget, Pierre-Michel (2005). Seed fate: predation, dispersal, and seedling establishment. CABI Pub. ISBN 0-85199-806-2. OCLC 54803650.
- Friedman, Jannice (2011). "Gone with the wind: understanding evolutionary transitions between wind and animal pollination in the angiosperms". The New Phytologist. 191 (4): 911–913. Bibcode:2011NewPh.191..911F. doi:10.1111/j.1469-8137.2011.03845.x. JSTOR 20869225. PMID 21834912.
- Friis, Else Marie; Doyle, James A.; Endress, Peter K.; Leng, Qin (2003). "Archaefructus – angiosperm precursor or specialized early angiosperm?". Trends in Plant Science. 8 (8): 369–373. doi:10.1016/S1360-1385(03)00161-4. PMID 12927969.
- Georgadaki, Katerina; Khoury, Nikolas; Spandidos, Demetrios A.; Zoumpourlis, Vasilis (2016). "The molecular basis of fertilization (review)". International Journal of Molecular Medicine. 38 (4): 979–986. doi:10.3892/ijmm.2016.2723. PMC 5029953. PMID 27599669.
- Gomez, Bernard; Daviero-Gomez, Véronique; Coiffard, Clément; Barral, Abel; Martín-Closas, Carles; Dilcher, David L. (December 2020). "Montsechia vidalii from the Barremian of Spain, the earliest known submerged aquatic angiosperm, and its systematic relationship to Ceratophyllum". Taxon. 69 (6): 1273–1292. Bibcode:2020Taxon..69.1273G. doi:10.1002/tax.12409.
- Goody, Jack (1993). The culture of flowers. Cambridge University Press. ISBN 0-521-41441-5 – via the Internet Archive.
- Höcherl, Nicole; Siede, Reinhold; Illies, Ingrid; Gätschenberger, Heike; Tautz, Jürgen (February 2012). "Evaluation of the nutritive value of maize for honey bees". Journal of Insect Physiology. 58 (2): 278–285. Bibcode:2012JInsP..58..278H. doi:10.1016/j.jinsphys.2011.12.001. PMID 22172382.
- Howe, H F; Smallwood, J (November 1982). "Ecology of Seed Dispersal". Annual Review of Ecology and Systematics. 13 (1): 201–228. Bibcode:1982AnRES..13..201H. doi:10.1146/annurev.es.13.110182.001221.
- Kostyun, Jamie L.; Robertson, Josephine E.; Preston, Jill C. (2019). "Evidence of a largely staminal origin for the Jaltomata calliantha (Solanaceae) floral corona". EvoDevo. 10 (1): 9. doi:10.1186/s13227-019-0122-9. PMC 6475103. PMID 31019674.
- Krishnamurthy, K. V. (2015). "Pre-fertilization: Reproductive Growth and Development". Plant Biology and Biotechnology. pp. 409–440. doi:10.1007/978-81-322-2286-6_17. ISBN 978-81-322-2285-9.
- Leins, Peter (2010). Flower and fruit: morphology, ontogeny, phylogeny, function and ecology. Claudia Erbar. Schweizerbart. ISBN 978-3-510-65261-7. OCLC 678542669.
- Li, Zheng; Lathe, Rahul S.; Li, Jinping; He, Hong; Bhalerao, Rishikesh P. (January 2022). "Towards understanding the biological foundations of perenniality". Trends in Plant Science. 27 (1): 56–68. Bibcode:2022TPS....27...56L. doi:10.1016/j.tplants.2021.08.007. PMID 34561180.
- Magallón, Susana; Gómez-Acevedo, Sandra; Sánchez-Reyes, Luna L.; Hernández-Hernández, Tania (July 2015). "A metacalibrated time-tree documents the early rise of flowering plant phylogenetic diversity". New Phytologist. 207 (2): 437–453. Bibcode:2015NewPh.207..437M. doi:10.1111/nph.13264. PMID 25615647.
- Mauseth, James D. (2016). Botany: an introduction to plant biology (6th ed.). Jones & Bartlett Learning. ISBN 978-1-284-07753-7.
- Miller, Renee; Owens, Simon J.; Rørslett, Bjørn (March 2011). "Plants and colour: Flowers and pollination". Optics & Laser Technology. 43 (2): 282–294. Bibcode:2011OptLT..43..282M. doi:10.1016/j.optlastec.2008.12.018.
- Minorsky, Peter V. (2019). "The functions of foliar nyctinasty: a review and hypothesis". Biological Reviews. 94 (1): 216–229. Bibcode:2019BioRv..94..216M. doi:10.1111/brv.12444. PMC 7379275. PMID 29998471.
- Murai, Koji (2013). "Homeotic genes and the ABCDE model for floral organ formation in wheat". Plants. 2 (3): 379–395. Bibcode:2013Plnts...2..379M. doi:10.3390/plants2030379. PMC 4844379. PMID 27137382.
- Namba, Shigetou (2019). "Molecular and biological properties of phytoplasmas". Proceedings of the Japan Academy, Series B. 95 (7): 401–418. Bibcode:2019PJAB...95..401N. doi:10.2183/pjab.95.028. PMC 6766451. PMID 31406061.
- Ng, Medard; Yanofsky, Martin F. (2001). "Function and evolution of the plant MADS-box gene family". Nature Reviews Genetics. 2 (3): 186–195. doi:10.1038/35056041. PMID 11256070.
- Northfield, Tobin D.; Ives, Anthony R. (2013). Barton, Nick H. (ed.). "Coevolution and the effects of climate change on interacting species". PLOS Biology. 11 (10) e1001685. doi:10.1371/journal.pbio.1001685. PMC 3805473. PMID 24167443.
- Ollerton, Jeff (2017). "Pollinator diversity: distribution, ecological function, and conservation". Annual Review of Ecology, Evolution, and Systematics. 48: 353–376. doi:10.1146/annurev-ecolsys-110316-022919.
- Osiadacz, Barbara; Kręciała, Mirosław (2014). "Ophrys apifera Huds. (Orchidaceae), a new orchid species to the flora of Poland". Biodiversity Research and Conservation. 36 (1): 11–16. doi:10.2478/biorc-2014-0027.
- Pandey, A. K. (2023). Reproductive biology of angiosperms (1st ed.). CRC Press. ISBN 978-1-032-19620-6.
- Peach, Kristen; Mazer, Susan J. (2019). "Heteranthery in Clarkia: pollen performance of dimorphic anthers contradicts expectations". American Journal of Botany. 106 (4): 598–603. doi:10.1002/ajb2.1262. PMID 30901494.
- Van Der Pijl, Leendert (1972). Principles of Dispersal in Higher Plants. doi:10.1007/978-3-642-96108-3. ISBN 978-3-642-96110-6.
- Prunet, Nathanaël; Morel, Patrice; Negrutiu, Ioan; Trehin, Christophe (2009). "Time to stop: flower meristem termination". Plant Physiology. 150 (4): 1764–1772. Bibcode:2009PlanP.150.1764P. doi:10.1104/pp.109.141812. PMC 2719151. PMID 19493967.
- Reynolds, Joan; Tampion, John (1983). Double flowers: a scientific study. [Published for the] Polytechnic of Central London Press [by] Pembridge Press. ISBN 0-86206-004-4 – via the Internet Archive.
- Rogers, Hilary J. (2006). "Programmed dell death in floral organs: how and why do flowers die?". Annals of Botany. 97 (3): 309–315. doi:10.1093/aob/mcj051. PMC 2803638. PMID 16394024.
- Rouhan, Germinal; Gaudeul, Myriam (2021). "Plant taxonomy: A historical perspective, current challenges, and perspectives". In Besse, Pascale (ed.). Molecular plant taxonomy: methods and protocols. Methods in molecular biology (2nd ed.). Humana Press. ISBN 978-1-0716-0997-2.
- Rudall, Paula J.; Hilton, Jason; Vergara-Silva, Francisco; Bateman, Richard M. (March 2011). "Recurrent abnormalities in conifer cones and the evolutionary origins of flower-like structures". Trends in Plant Science. 16 (3): 151–159. Bibcode:2011TPS....16..151R. doi:10.1016/j.tplants.2010.11.002. PMID 21144793.
- Santos, Izabel Cristina dos; Reis, Simone Novaes (2021). "Edible flowers: traditional and current use". Ornamental Horticulture. 27 (4): 438–445. Bibcode:2021OHRBH..27..438S. doi:10.1590/2447-536X.v27i4.2392.
- Sarma, Khoisnam; Tandon, Rajesh; Shivanna, K. R.; Ram, H. Y. Mohan (2007). "Snail-pollination in Volvulopsis nummularium". Current Science. 93 (6): 826–831. JSTOR 24099128.
- Sattler, R. (1973). Organogenesis of flowers. A photographic text-atlas. University of Toronto Press. ISBN 0-8020-0193-9 – via Internet Archive.
- Sauquet, Hervé; von Balthazar, Maria; Magallón, Susana; Doyle, James A.; Endress, Peter K.; Bailes, Emily J.; Barroso de Morais, Erica; Bull-Hereñu, Kester; Carrive, Laetitia; Chartier, Marion; Chomicki, Guillaume; Coiro, Mario; Cornette, Raphaël; El Ottra, Juliana H. L.; Epicoco, Cyril (2017). "The ancestral flower of angiosperms and its early diversification". Nature Communications. 8 (1) 16047. Bibcode:2017NatCo...816047S. doi:10.1038/ncomms16047. PMC 5543309. PMID 28763051.
- Sharma, O. P. (2009). Plant taxonomy (2nd ed.). Tata McGraw Hill Education Private Limited. ISBN 978-0-07-014159-9.
- Sinclair, John M. (1998). Collins English dictionary (4th Revised ed.). HarperCollins. ISBN 978-0-00-470453-1 – via the Internet Archive.
- Singer, Rodrigo B.; Marsaioli, Anita Jocelyne; Flach, Adriana; Reis, Mariza G. (2006). "The ecology and chemistry of pollination in Brazilian orchids: recent advances". Floriculture, ornamental and plant biotechnology. Global Science Books. ISBN 4-903313-00-X.
- Song, Bo; Sun, Lu; Barrett, Spencer C. H.; Moles, Angela T.; Luo, Ya-Huang; Armbruster, W. Scott; Gao, Yong-Qian; Zhang, Shuang; Zhang, Zhi-Qiang; Sun, Hang (2022). "Global analysis of floral longevity reveals latitudinal gradients and biotic and abiotic correlates". New Phytologist. 235 (5): 2054–2065. Bibcode:2022NewPh.235.2054S. doi:10.1111/nph.18271. PMID 35611604.
- Sun, Jiyu; Bhushan, Bharat; Tong, Jin (2013). "Structural coloration in nature". RSC Advances. 3 (35): 14862. Bibcode:2013RSCAd...314862S. doi:10.1039/C3RA41096J.
- Turck, F.; Fornara, F.; Coupland, G. (2008). "Regulation and identity of florigen: flowering locus T moves centre Stage". Annual Review of Plant Biology. 59 (1): 573–594. Bibcode:2008AnRPB..59..573T. doi:10.1146/annurev.arplant.59.032607.092755. hdl:11858/00-001M-0000-0012-374F-8. PMID 18444908.
- Vázquez-Fresno, Rosa; Rosana, Albert Remus R.; Sajed, Tanvir; Onookome-Okome, Tuviere; Wishart, Noah A.; Wishart, David S. (2019). "Herbs and spices- biomarkers of intake based on human intervention studies – a systematic review". Genes & Nutrition. 14 (1): 18. doi:10.1186/s12263-019-0636-8. PMC 6532192. PMID 31143299.
- Voon, Han Ching; Bhat, Rajeev; Rusul, Gulam (2012). "Flower extracts and their essential oils as potential antimicrobial agents for food uses and pharmaceutical applications". Comprehensive Reviews in Food Science and Food Safety. 11 (1): 34–55. doi:10.1111/j.1541-4337.2011.00169.x.
- Vu, Danh C.; Alvarez, Sophie (2021). "Phenolic, carotenoid and saccharide compositions of Vietnamese Camellia sinensis teas and herbal teas". Molecules. 26 (21): 6496. doi:10.3390/molecules26216496. PMC 8587765. PMID 34770903.
- Walker, Timothy (2020). Pollination: The enduring relationship between plant and pollinator. Princeton University Press. ISBN 978-0-691-20375-1.
- Wang, Xin (2023). "Origin of angiosperms: problems, challenges, and solutions". Life. 13 (10): 2029. Bibcode:2023Life...13.2029W. doi:10.3390/life13102029. PMC 10607945. PMID 37895411.
- Wang, Yunyun; Luo, Ao; Lyu, Tong; Dimitrov, Dimitar; Liu, Yunpeng; Li, Yichao; Xu, Xiaoting; Freckleton, Robert P; Hao, Zhanqing; Wang, Zhiheng (2023). "Global distribution and evolutionary transitions of floral symmetry in angiosperms". Science Advances. 9 (43) eadg2555. Bibcode:2023SciA....9G2555W. doi:10.1126/sciadv.adg2555. PMC 10599613. PMID 37878700.
- Weberling, Focko (1992). Morphology of flowers and inflorescences. Cambridge University Press. ISBN 0-521-25134-6 – via the Internet Archive.
- Xu, Shujuan; Chong, Kang (2018). "Remembering winter through vernalisation". Nature Plants. 4 (12): 997–1009. Bibcode:2018NatPl...4..997X. doi:10.1038/s41477-018-0301-z. PMID 30478363.
- Zhang, Yangbo; Xiong, Yifan; An, Huimin; Li, Juan; Li, Qin; Huang, Jianan; Liu, Zhonghua (2022). "Analysis of volatile components of jasmine and jasmine tea during scenting process". Molecules. 27 (2): 479. doi:10.3390/molecules27020479. PMC 8779377. PMID 35056794.
- Zinn, Isabelle (2019). "The 'truly creative' florists: when creativity becomes a gendered privilege". Journal of Contemporary Ethnography. 48 (3): 429–447. doi:10.1177/0891241618792074.
