= UV coloration in flowers =

Natural phenomenon

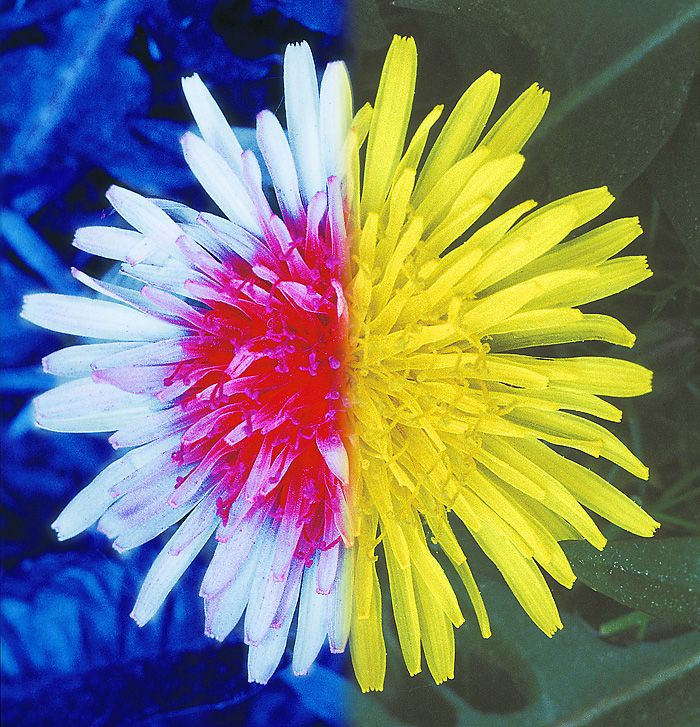
Dandelion under both UV light coloration (left) and visible light coloration (right).

UV coloration is a natural phenomenon that leads to unique interactions between organisms that have evolved the ability to perceive these wavelengths of light. It serves as one method to attract pollinators to the flower along with scent, shape, and nectar quality. Flowers are known for their range of visible colors that humans can see with their eyes and observe an array of different shades and patterns. The naked eye cannot see the ultraviolet coloration many flowers employ to bring attention to themselves. By either reflecting or absorbing UV light waves, flowers are able to communicate with pollinators. This allows plants that may require an animal pollinator to stand out from other flowers or distinguish where their flowers are in a muddied background of other plant parts. For the plant, it is important to share and receive pollen so they can reproduce, maintain their ecological role, and guide the evolutionary history of the population.

== Background ==
Ultraviolet light is a form of electromagnetic radiation that ranges in wavelengths from 10 nm to 400 nm. This wavelength is shorter than visible light but longer than X-rays. The name is derived from its position just beyond the higher ("ultra"), by frequency and energy, end of visible light, in conjunction with the closest visible color (violet). The most effective wavelength of UV light is approximately 250 nm. It was discovered in 1801 by German scientist Johann Wilhelm Ritter when he noticed that paper soaked with silver chloride darkened faster than regular paper when hit by sunlight. Then in 1878, UV light was first observed to have the ability to kill bacteria which led to understanding how UV can damage cells and mutate DNA in 1960. At that point they began to refer to it as "ionizing radiation" for the harmful impacts the shorter wavelengths exhibited. Also it can be used in microscopy as a tag known by Green Fluorescent Protein (GFP) to track development and movement of structures within the cell when shined under UV emitting lightbulbs. Ultraviolet light has positive effects such as vitamin-D production in skin tissue and negative effects of sunburn damage and inflammation in the same part of the body.

== Function by plants and pollinators ==
Ultraviolet coloration is used by 25 to 35 percent of angiosperms. It was adapted by flowers to orient pollinators leading to an example of co-evolution. UV light allows them to broadcast a guide to where their pollen is located. Due to unique life characteristics and morphology of flowers, pollinators are more effective at taking the pollen and spreading it to other flowers of the same species. Flowers have specifically adapted to consistently target a particular pollinator as their hue or intensity of coloration is in the peak wavelength for their pollinator to see and be attracted to. A flower's size, shape, color, scent, and pattern all play a role in signaling with the senses of pollinators. Plants that rely on animal pollinators are most likely to use the UV coloration strategy compared to other plants to increase the odds of them being pollinated. Some examples of animal pollinators are bees, butterflies, beetles, flies, birds, bats, and a few small mammals. This wide range of species seek out the nectar produced by the plants as food source or in the famous case of honey bees the key ingredient for making honey. This is an example of mutualism where the pollinators receive a resource in exchange for aiding plants in their pollination and reproduction.

UV patterns can vary among like species and unlike species. UV reflection is independent of flower symmetry, but larger size does increase the frequency of reflection. The visible color of the flower impacts the UV color. Yellow flowers having the greatest measure of reflectance. It is more typical to observe UV coloration in purple, red and yellow flowers while white and green ones are less likely. Generally flowers that are white or green tend to be wind pollinated; where being a bright color isn't necessary. A common phenotype of UV coloration is the "bulls-eye" pattern where a flower reflects UV light at the ends of the petals and absorbs UV light in the center. This acts as a guide for pollinators to locate and find pollen. Other flowers add the contrast between their reproductive parts (anthers and pistils) and their petals. Flowers use chemical and physical structures within petal tissue to create UV coloration. For example, flavonoids are responsible for absorption of UV. As plants move into new environments they will continue to manipulate and shift their UV profile.

== Evolution ==
As plants have evolved and adapted their UV coloration, pollinators have also fine-tuned their individual adaptations to maximize their ability to target flowers for food. The dynamic relationship between the pollinators and the pollinated has led to novel mutations and in some cases novel species. Pollinators are drivers of speciation as they are the crux of survival for plants that rely on them for reproductive success. This example of directional selection leads to convergent evolution of flower size, structure, and coloring patterns. For example, if a bee favors a flowers with larger petals then those individual will be more successful at reproduction leading to more and more individuals within a population to have large flowers. Pollinators demonstrate local environmental adaptations in their visual sensory response systems to the amount of light. It is shown that red and white flowers pollinated by bees are of higher spectral purity as compared to bird-pollinated ones and are therefore easier to detect for bees. Bees have trichromatic vision with maxima of peak sensitivities in UV (344 nm), blue (436 nm) and green (544 nm). Also, bees have preferential treatment towards flowers that use small guides and combine both UV reflectance and absorption has been documented many times in many locations. The interactions are very precise and slight changes in the intensity or size of UV reflectance and/or absorbance affects pollinator behavior along with rate of visitors. Therefore, decreased UV coloration on the petals leads to few exchanges of pollen with pollinators causing a reduction in an individual's evolutionary fitness.

== Other examples of UV being used ==
While angiosperms take advantage of ultraviolet patterns to be seen, primitive gymnosperms have pollen that reflects UV light. This brings up questions on the evolutionary origins of this phenomenon. It is believed that reflecting UV light is actually a protective measure plants utilize to prevent DNA damage from the UV in sunlight. This is understandable as UV wavelengths can mutate and even destroy organic structures like DNA and skin tissue which is why humans experience sunburn. The pollen grains reflect UV-beta to shield their chromosomes stored in the pollen from UV-alpha which is important for making sure of reproductive success. The technique of UV coloration has evolved in other species as well for various reasons. Similarly, carnivorous plants reflect and absorb UV to attract prey to it. They mimic the strategy used by traditional flowers for pollination to exploit pollinators to land in the trap so the carnivorous flower head can digest them as a source of key nutrients to grow and survive. Butterflies, a common insect pollinator, use UV coloration in their wing patterns to achieve an extra level of modelling their fitness to potential mates.
