= Akaryocyte =

Akaryocytes, also known as akaryotes or acaryotes, are cells without a nucleus. The name is derived from the Greek prefix "a-", meaning "without" and the Greek "karyo-", meaning "nut" or "kernel".

== Types ==
Akaryotes come in many different forms. Overall, there are four main types of akaryocytes discovered: Erythrocytes, commonly known as red blood cells, are a in mammals concave-shaped cells responsible for gas exchange, and the transfer of nutrients throughout an organism. Mammal red blood cells are classified as akaryocytes because they lack a cell nucleus after they have fully developed. The most common types of akaryocytes are bacteria, and archaea. Bacteria and archaea are unicellular organisms that lack organelles–specifically, a nucleus. They lack nuclei but contain other organelles that assist with the replication processes. Viruses are sometimes considered akaryocytes but the suffix "cyte" means cells. Akaryote is also used as a synonym for akaryocyte however 'ote" implies a taxonomic relationship that does not exist among akaryocytes.

== Contribution ==
Akaryotes play a special role in maintaining healthy ecosystems. Bacteria and archaea, specifically, have contributed to the stability of ecological sciences. A crucial process both bacteria and archaea are involved in is nitrification–the oxidation of ammonia, which contributes to healthier agricultural ecosystems, thus, areas containing mainly soil.
