= International Association for Visual Semiotics =

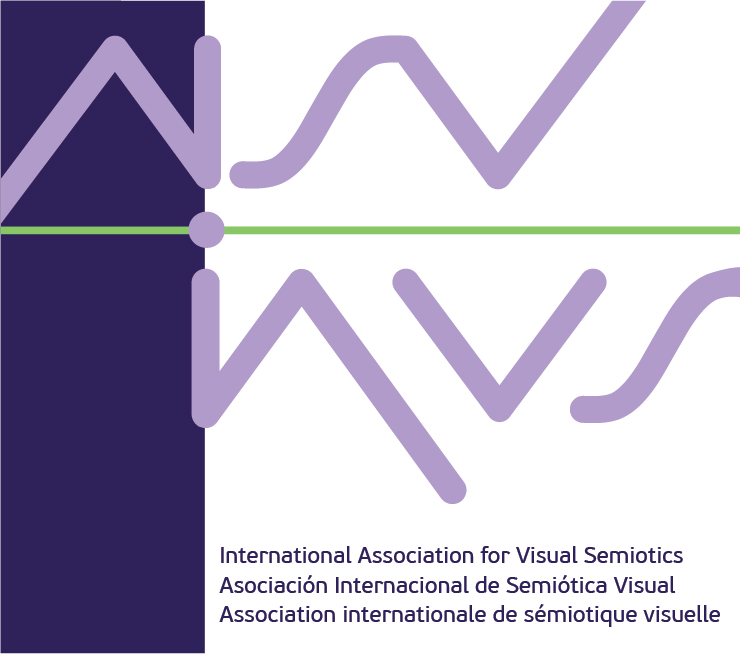
- Abbreviation: AISV-IAVS
- Formation: 1989
- Purpose: Educational
- Region served: Worldwide
- Official language: French, English, Spanish
- Main organ: General Assembly
- Website: http://aisviavs.wordpress.com/

Born from an exchange of ideas between Michel Costantini and Göran Sonesson during the congress of the International Association for Semiotic Studies held in Perpignan, in the south of France, in 1988, the International Association for Visual Semiotics (Asociación Internacional de Semiótica Visual, in Spanish, Association internationale de sémiotique visuelle, in French, the three official languages of the association), whose abbreviation is AISV-IAVS, was officially founded as an association under the French law in 1989 in Blois, France, where the first international congress was held in 1990.

The congress had in that opportunity more than one hundred of visual semioticians coming from all over the world. At that time, the association was called International Association of Semiology of the Image, or AISIM (according to its acronym in French), and its name was changed in 1992.

As its name indicates (visual semiotics), the main objective of the IAVS is to gather semioticians all over the world who are interested in images and, in more general terms, in visual signification, without privileging any particular interpretation of semiotics, and without favoring any semiotic tradition in particular.

The Association is recognized in the literature as an international scholarly society.

== The congresses ==
After the foundational congress in Blois, the second congress of the IAVS was held in Bilbao, Spain, in 1992, while the third congress was integrated with the international congress of the AIS-IASS (International Association for Semiotic Studies) held at the University of California, Berkeley, USA, in 1994. The next congresses were organized in São Paulo, Brazil (1996), Siena, Italy (1998), Quebec City, Canada (2001). The 7th congress was organized in Mexico City in 2003 and was continued with the sessions of 2004 in Lyon, during the 8th Congress of the International Association for Semiotic Studies. The 8th congress was held in Istanbul in 2007, the 9th one was in Venice in 2010, the 10th one was in Buenos Aires in 2012, and the 11th one was in Liège in 2015.

The IAVS has also organized meetings or sessions together with the International Association of the Semiotics of Space, mainly during the IASS congress held in Dresden, Germany, in October 1999. Other joint sessions were held during the IAVS congress in Quebec City. The IAVS has also organized sessions on visual semiotics during the congress of the IASS in A Coruña (2009), and regional European conferences in Lisbon, in 2011, and Urbino, in 2014.

== Chronology of congresses ==
No.	year	City, country	organizing or hosting institution
1st	1990	Blois, France	Ministère de la Culture et de la Communication
2nd	1992	Bilbao, Spain	University of the Basque Country
3rd	1994	Berkeley, United States	University of California, Berkeley
4th	1996	São Paulo, Brazil	Pontifícia Universidade Católica de São Paulo
5th	1998	Siena, Italy	University of Siena
6th	2001	Quebec City, Canada	Université Laval
7th	2003	Mexico City, Mexico	Monterrey Institute of Technology
8th	2007	Istanbul, Turkey	Istanbul Kültür University
9th	2010	Venice, Italy	Università Iuav di Venezia
10th	2012	Buenos Aires, Argentina	University of Buenos Aires
11th	2015	Liège, Belgium	Université de Liège

== Other meetings or sessions ==
year	City, country	organizer	context
1999	Dresden, Germany	Dresden University of Technology	7th IASS-AIS congress
2004	Lyon, France	Lumière University Lyon 2	8th IASS-AIS congress
2009	A Coruña, Spain	University of A Coruña	10th IASS-AIS congress
2011	Lisbon, Portugal	Calouste Gulbenkian Foundation	Regional European congress
2014	Urbino, Italy	Centro Internazionale di Scienze Semiotiche	Regional European congress

== Executive committee ==
The first president of the IAVS was Michel Costantini in 1989. The first elected president was Fernande Saint-Martin, from the Université du Québec à Montréal. The second president, elected during the congress in Berkeley, California, in 1994, was Jacques Fontanille, from the University of Limoges. Ana Claudia de Oliveira, from the Pontifícia Universidade Católica de São Paulo, was elected president during the congress held in São Paulo in 1996, and Paolo Fabbri, from the University of Bologna, was elected president in Siena in 1998. Jean-Marie Klinkenberg, from the University of Liège, and member of the Groupe μ, was elected president during the congress in Quebec City in 2001, and has been re-elected at the general assemblies held in Lyon 2004, Istanbul 2007 and Venice 2010. José Luis Caivano, from the University of Buenos Aires, was elected president in the conference of 2012. The current president, since the conference 2015, is Göran Sonesson, from the University of Lund, Sweden.

== Chronology of members of the executive committee ==
1989-1990 (nominated in Blois)
- president: (France) Michel Costantini
- secretary: Jean-Jacques Huby
- treasurer: Geneviève Cittanova

1990-1992 (elected in Blois)
- president: (Canada) Fernande Saint-Martin
- vice-presidents: Göran Sonesson, Claude Gandelman, Michel Costantini
- general secretary: Jean-Jacques Huby
- deputy secretary: Geneviève Cittanova
- a treasurer was not elected

1992-1994 (elected in Bilbao)
- president: (Canada) Fernande Saint-Martin
- vice-presidents and secretaries (not differentiated): Jean-Marie Klinkenberg, Göran Sonesson, Claude Gandelman, José María Nadal

1994-1996 (elected in Berkeley)
- president: (France) Jacques Fontanille
- vice-presidents: Göran Sonesson, Claude Gandelman, José María Nadal, Jean-Marie Klinkenberg
- general secretary: Michel Costantini
- executive secretary: Ana Claudia Mei Alves de Oliveira
- deputy secretary: Kim Young Hae
- financial delegate: Pascal Sanson

1996-1998 (elected in São Paulo)
- president: (Brazil) Ana Claudia Mei Alves de Oliveira
- vice-presidents: Oscar Steimberg, Michel Costantini
- general secretary: Lucia Corrain
- deputy secretary: Kim Young Hae
- treasurer: Stefano Montes

1998-2001 (elected in Siena)
- president: (Italy) Paolo Fabbri
- vice-presidents: Eduardo Peñuela Cañizal, Marie Carani, Michel Costantini, Ana Claudia Mei Alves de Oliveira, Göran Sonesson, Oscar Steimberg
- general secretary: Manar Hammad
- deputy secretary: Kim Young Hae
- financial delegate: Martine Joly

2001-2004 (elected in Quebec City)
- president: (Belgium) Jean-Marie Klinkenberg
- vice-presidents: Eduardo Peñuela Cañizal, Marie Carani, José Luis Caivano, Julieta Haidar, François Jost, Pascal Sanson
- executive secretary: Göran Sonesson
- treasurer: Michel Costantini

2004-2007 (elected in Lyon)
- president: (Belgium) Jean-Marie Klinkenberg
- vice-presidents: Eduardo Peñuela Cañizal, Marie Carani, José Luis Caivano, Pascal Sanson, Alfredo Cid Jurado
- general secretary: Göran Sonesson
- treasurer: Michel Costantini

2007-2010 (elected in Istanbul)
- president: (Belgium) Jean-Marie Klinkenberg
- vice-presidents: José Luis Caivano, Eduardo Peñuela Cañizal, Pascal Sanson, Alfredo Cid Jurado, Nükhet Güz, Rocco Mangieri
- general secretary: Göran Sonesson
- treasurer: Michel Costantini

2010-2012 (elected in Venice)
- president: (Belgium) Jean-Marie Klinkenberg
- vice-presidents: José Luis Caivano, Eduardo Peñuela Cañizal, Alfredo Cid Jurado, Nükhet Güz, Rocco Mangieri, Isabel Marcos, Tiziana Migliore
- general secretary: Göran Sonesson
- treasurer: Michel Costantini

2012-2015 (elected in Buenos Aires)
- president: (Argentina) José Luis Caivano
- vice-presidents: Alfredo Cid Jurado, Maria Giulia Dondero, Rengin Kucukerdogan, Eduardo Peñuela Cañizal, Rocco Mangieri, Isabel Marcos, Tiziana Migliore
- general secretary: Göran Sonesson
- treasurer: Lynn Bannon

2015-2018 (elected in Liège)
- president: (Sweden) Göran Sonesson
- vice-presidents: Alfredo Cid Jurado, Rengin Kucukerdogan, Rocco Mangieri, Isabel Marcos, Tiziana Migliore, Anne Beyaert-Geslin, Elizabeth Harkot-de-la-Taille
- general secretary: Maria Giulia Dondero
- treasurer: Everardo Reyes

== Publications ==
In its beginnings, the IAVS used the journal EIDOS, Bulletin international de sémiologie de l’image, created previously by the research group with the same name in Blois (François Rabelais University, Tours), as the organ of research. However, after 1996, the IAVS started to publish its official journal, VISIO, Revue internationale de sémiotique visuelle, with the financial and logistic support of the CRSHC and the CÉLAT, at the Faculty of Literature, Université Laval, in Quebec City.

VISIO has published 4 thematic issues per year, from 1996 until 2002, under the direction of invited editors, and has accepted articles written in the three official languages: French, English and Spanish. Fernande Saint-Martin, from the Université du Québec à Montréal, has been the general director, and Marie Carani, from the Université Laval, has been the editor-in-chief. The honorary committee was composed by Hubert Damisch, Umberto Eco and Boris Uspenskij. In the editorial committee have served José Luis Caivano, from the University of Buenos Aires, Michel Costantini, from the Paris 8 University, Jacques Fontanille, from the University of Limoges, Donald Preziosi, from the University of California, Los Angeles, and Göran Sonesson, from the University of Lund in Sweden. The members of the editorial committee are assisted by an international scientific committee composed by more than 70 specialists in general semiotics and visual semiotics, distributed all over the world.
