= Versus (journal) =

- Discipline: Semiotics
- Language: English

Publication details
- History: 1971–present

Standard abbreviations
- ISO 4: Versus

Indexing
- ISSN: 0393-8255

Links
- Journal homepage

Versus: Quaderni di studi semiotici (often abbreviated as VS) is a semiotic journal in Italy. Founded by Umberto Eco, et al. in 1971, it has been an important confrontation space for a large number of scholars of several fields coping with signs and signification. Its foundation and activities have contributed to consolidate the perception of semiotics as an academic field in itself both in Italy and in Europe.

Versus has published original articles by most influential European semioticians, including; Umberto Eco, A.J. Greimas, Jean-Marie Floch, Paolo Fabbri, Jacques Fontanille, Claude Zilberberg, Ugo Volli and Patrizia Violi. At the same time, almost every issue also contains articles by younger, less famous semioticians dealing with new research perspectives in semiotics.

Each issue is focused on a specific argument, like iconism, translation and history of sign or on studies regarding a specific author (such as Louis Hjelmslev, Charles Sanders Peirce or Michel Bréal).
