= Allotopy =

In a story, an allotopy is when two basic meaning traits (semes) contradict each other; that is, when they trace two incompatible interpretations. It was conceived as being the opposite of an isotopy, which is the homogeneity resulting from repetition of the same seme. The concept was coined in the 1970s by the Belgian semioticians known as Groupe μ.

== History ==
In the 1970, the Belgian semioticians known under the name Groupe μ, introduced the concept of Allotopy. They first discussed the concept in publications like Isotopie et allotopie, Isotopie, allotopie et polytopie (1976), and A Rhetoric of Poetry (1977).

== Allotopy and humor ==
Groupe μ discussed the relation of allotopy to jokes and humor. Salvatore Attardo, despite not using the term allotopy, formulated a theory of humor based on the idea of the "incompatible interpretations", called the isotopy-disjunction model. This is part of the broader idea of defining humor as based on contradiction/incongruity.

== See also ==
- Allotopic syntagm
