= Claude Cossette =

Claude Cossette is an advertising man and a scholar born in Quebec City, Quebec, in 1937. He founded Cossette Communication Group in 1964, which he restructured in 1972 making his five top executives his equal partners. He headed the business as president until he resigned in 1982. At the time, the agency was the biggest communication organization in the Province of Quebec with offices in Quebec City, Montreal and Toronto.

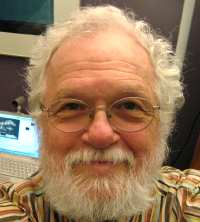
Claude Cossette

Cossette studied humanities at the Petit Séminaire de Québec, graduated in Advertising Art from L'Ecole des Beaux-Arts in 1962, got an MA in education from Laval University in 1963, and from the same, a Certificate in Marketing in 1962 and a Certificate in Business Administration in 1970, from which he got the tenure of Full professor in 1983. In 1964, he had graduated from L'École du Livre Estienne, Paris.

He is the author of many books, most about persuasive communication, criticizing advertising severely in La Publicité, déchet culturel 2001, Un loup parmi les loups (a novel), 2005 and Éthique & Publicité, 2009. He also published numerous research papers and general-public articles.

Cossette was the chairperson of the Programme de Communication Graphique at Laval University in 1975–1978 and once more in 1990–1997. In 1996, he launched ComViz-Communication visuelle, an online course, probably the first French language university level course that may be completed entirely through the Internet. He was the Pedagogical Director of a series of 26 TV programs on Advertising in Quebec. He lectured on advertising and communication at many international conferences, universities and colleges.

He is or was member of L'Association des dirigeants d'agences de publicité du Québec, La Société des graphistes du Québec, The International Association for Semiotic Studies, The International Communication Association, The Canadian Association of Applied Social Research, La Confrérie des Compagnons de Gutenberg (Europe) and many others.

Cossette was granted the highest honors both from Quebec and Canada. He was recipient of Le Prix des Communications du Québec in 1984 and The Gold Medal Award from The Association of Canadian Advertisers (ACA) in 1988. He is still teaching social marketing and advertising at Université Laval in Quebec City, Canada.

== See also ==
Interview du professeur Luc Dupont, phd
