= Isotopy (semiotics) =

Concept in Semiotics

In a story, we detect an isotopy when there is a repetition of a basic meaning trait (seme); such repetition, establishing some level of familiarity within the story, allows for a uniform reading/interpretation of it. An example of a sentence containing an isotopy is I drink some water. The two words drink and water share a seme (a reference to liquids), and this gives homogeneity to the sentence.

This concept, introduced by Greimas in 1966, had a major impact on the field of semiotics, and was redefined multiple times. Catherine Kerbrat-Orecchioni extended the concept to denote the repetition of not only semes, but also other semiotic units (like phonemes for isotopies as rhymes, rhythm for prosody, etc.). Umberto Eco showed the flaws of using the concept of "repetition", and replaced it with the concept of "direction", redefining isotopy as "the direction taken by an interpretation of the text".

== Redefinitions ==
The concept was highly influential and has been revisited and redefined by multiple authors, starting from Greimas, to his epigons of the Paris school, Umberto Eco, the Groupe μ, and others.

Greimas' initial definition was based on the concept of repetition (also termed recurrence or redundancy), was focused on semantics as it only regarded the repetition semes, and it stressed the role of isotopy of making possible a uniform reading of a story and resolving ambiguities. To quote his first 1966 formulation: "a redundant set of semantic categories which make possible the uniform reading of the story."

In 1980 Umberto Eco showed a flaw of using the concept of "repetition". He noted that there are cases in which an isotopy is not a repetition of a seme, like in the French sentence l'ami des simples = l'herboriste, in which ami (meaning lover, friend or fan) and simples (medicinal plants) does not appear to share a seme; to also embrace cases like this, Eco replaced the concept of "repetition" with the concept of "direction", defining isotopy more generally as "a constancy in going in a direction that a text exhibits when submitted to rules of interpretative coherence."

=== Beyond semantic isotopy ===
Catherine Kerbrat-Orecchioni systematically extended the concept of isotopy to denote the repetition of any semiotic unit. She identified semantic, phonetic, prosodic, stylistic, enunciative, rhetorical, presuppositional, syntactic, and narrative isotopies.

A semantic isotopy, the narrower and most common type of isotopy, the one of Greimas's original definition, is the recurrence of semes. A phonetic isotopy is the recurrence of phonomenes, like in rhyme, assonance and alliteration. A prosodic isotopy is the recurrence of the same rhythm.

Reviewing the many uses of the term isotopy, Eco concluded that although they all have something in common, isotopy is more of an "umbrella term" that covers all these different phenomena. Semantic isotopies alone can denote at times contextual disambiguation, subcategorization and selection restriction, anaphoric antecedent attribution, morphological agreement, or even other phenomena.

== Derived terms and prefixes ==
Many derivative terms of isotopy have been defined, often with an added prefix, like bi-isotopy, which could be used to define an ambiguous expression that has two possible interpretations.

In the 1970s, the Belgian semioticians known under the name Groupe μ, introduced the concept of allotopy, conceived as the opposite of an isotopy. An allotopy is when two basic meaning traits (semes) contradict each other, as in the sentence I drink some concrete.
