= Theory of painting =

Subfield of music theory

The idea of founding a theory of painting after the model of music theory was suggested by Goethe in 1807 and gained much regard among the avant-garde artists of the 1920s, the Weimar culture period, like Paul Klee.

== From Goethe to Klee ==
Goethe famously said in 1807 that painting "lacks any established, accepted theory as exists in music". Kandinsky in 1911 reprised Goethe, agreeing that painting needed a solid foundational theory, and such a theory should be patterned after the model of music theory, and adding that there is a deep relationship between all the arts, not only between music and painting.

The comparison of painting with music gained much regard among the avant-garde artists of the 1920s, the Weimar culture period, like Paul Klee.

== Structural semantic rhetoric ==
The Belgian semioticians known under the name Groupe μ, developed a method of painting research called structural semantic rhetoric; this method aims to determine the stylistic and aesthetic features of any painting utilizing the rhetorical operations of addition, omission, permutation and transposition.

== See also ==
- Aesthetics of music
- Philosophy of music
- Synesthesia in art
- Visual semiotics
