= Jacques Dubois (literary theorist) =

Belgian literary theorist and academic (1933–2026)

Jacques Dubois (20 March 1933 – 12 February 2026) was a Belgian literary theorist and academic who was Professor Emeritus of Literature at the Université de Liège. He invented the concept of the Literary Institution following the work of Pierre Bourdieu by analogy with other social institutions such as military, medical, and political. He was also a member of the Groupe μ. In 1983, he was the main editor of the Manifesto for Walloon culture.

Dubois was born in Liège in 1933.

On 6 May 2003 the prestigious collection La Pléiade was enriched by 21 of Simenon's novels. Jacques Dubois, president of the Center for Georges Simenon Studies chose Simenon's books, written the notes and surveys with another Walloon Simenon specialist Benoît Denis. Jacques Dubois:

We were totally free to choose the 21 works which will be represented in the Pléiade. The choice was difficult and painful.

Benoît Denis:

We have of course included the inescapable masterpieces, The Snow Was Black, Act of Passion Mr. Hire's Engagement, The Little Saint. We wanted the different periods of his life, French, American, Swiss, to be represented. As a result we have included works from his beginnings, less known, like Tropic Moon and The House by the Canal, where, nonetheless, all of Simenon is already present. We have included relatively few Maigrets, as these novels have a rather pronounced standard and repetitive aspect.

Dubois died on 12 February 2026, at the age of 92.

== The literary institution ==
According to Michel Biron, "Jacques Dubois sought to establish the link between institution and text, while institution upon one of sociocriticism's and, his view, neglected goals, namely the conditions of the material conditions of a text."

== Works ==
- Rhétorique générale (avec le Groupe μ), Éditions Larousse, 1970. Réédition en format de poche, Éditions Le Seuil, Paris, 1992.
- Rhétorique de la poésie (avec le Groupe μ), Éditions Complexe, Bruxelles, 1977.
- L'essai, la critique in : La Wallonie, le Pays et les Hommes, La Renaissance du Livre, Bruxelles, 1979.
- Le secret du Manifeste in : La Revue Nouvelle, janvier 1984 (numéro spécial consacré au Manifesto for Walloon culture).
- L'institution de la littérature : Introduction à une sociologie, Bruxelles, Labor, 1990.
- Réalité wallonne et médias in : Jean-Claude Van Cauwenberghe, Oser être wallon, Quorum, Gerpinnes, 1998.
- Le Roman policier ou la modernité, Paris, Nathan, 1996.
- Pour Albertine. Proust et le sens du social, Paris, Seuil, 1997.
- Les Romanciers du réel. De Balzac à Simenon, Paris, Seuil, 2000.
- Stendhal. Une sociologie romanesque, Paris, La Découverte, 2007.
