= Folk definition =

Definition used in everyday communication

As a folk definition, philosophy and linguistics refer to definition-like methods used in everyday life to explain the meaning of a word or a particular concept. These definitions are shaped by cultural, social, and practical contexts, reflecting how people commonly perceive and interact with objects or ideas in their environment.

== General information ==
Scholarly literature often distinguishes between scientific and folk definitions. The folk definition is used to determine objects or concepts in everyday communication, while the scientific definition is used for communication in science and technical language. In lexicons, the definition used depends on the audience. Specialized lexicons use scientific definitions for experts, while general education lexicons prefer folk definitions.

== Folk definition in linguistics ==
Folk definitions are based on everyday understanding, while scientific definitions capture professional and scientific knowledge. Colloquial language and technical language influence each other.

== Comparison between folk definition and scientific definition ==
For example, in everyday life, water might be defined as a "liquid" composed of hydrogen and oxygen, because this is the most common state of matter for water. However, for scientific purposes, water is defined as a "chemical compound" of hydrogen and oxygen because it can also exist as ice or steam. From a scientific perspective, the folk definition is too narrow.

In everyday life, "waste" is defined as "leftover material no longer usable and ready for disposal," whereas the environmental policy definition is: "Waste consists of movable property that the owner wishes to dispose of or whose disposal is necessary for the public good, especially for environmental protection."

Further comparisons:

Term	Folk Definition	Scientific Definition
Supply	"something offered for sale or exchange"	"provision of goods and services at a market price"
Demand	"the need of buyers for certain goods"	"the expression of purchase interest in a specific market (capital market, goods market)"
Complexity	"multilayered, encompassing many different things"	Mathematics: "the computational complexity of an algorithm"
Mass media	"all media that reach a large audience, such as press and broadcasting"	"highly complex social and technical systems with a continuous flow of information targeted 'blindly' at a broad audience..."

While folk definitions are based on essential semantics, scientific definitions include additional professional features beyond the essential ones.

== Terminology ==
Since folk definitions are descriptions of the meaning of a referent, usually referred to by a lexeme, they are lexical explanations. Different scientific studies use various terms for such explanations.

The following terms are found in different academic works dealing with lexical meaning, synonymously used for folk definitions:

- "Definitions embedded within texts or sentence components."
- "Non-scientific explanations in everyday dialogues."
- "Contextual paraphrases of speech in non-conflicting function."
- "Everyday dialogues about lexical expressions."
- "Textual evidence of a metalinguistic character, in which historical language users express their views on texts, sentences, words, word meanings, grammatical forms, pronunciation, or spelling, reflecting the language of their time from their own perspective."
- "Semantically relevant formulation processing."

== Literature ==
- Greta Stanaitrytė, Folk Definitions and Their Functions, Dissertation, University of Mannheim, 2005.
