= Actant =

Type of role taken by a character

In narrative theory, an actant in the actantial model of semiotic narrative analysis is a type of role that a character may have in a narrative. Bruno Latour writes,

An “actor” in [actor-network theory] is a semiotic definition -an actant-, that is, something that acts or to which activity is granted by others. It implies no special motivation of human individual actors, nor of humans in general. An actant can literally be anything provided it is granted to be the source of an action.

The term actant also has uses in linguistics, sociology, computer programming theory, and astrology.

== In narratology ==
Algirdas Julien Greimas (1917–1992), professor of semiotics, is widely credited with producing the actantial model in 1966. This model reveals the structural roles typically performed in story telling; such as "hero, villain (opponent of hero), object (of quest), helper (of hero) and sender (who initiates the quest)." Each of these roles fulfills an integral component of the story, or, narrative. Without the contribution of each actant, the story may be incomplete. Thus, an "actant" is not simply a character in a story, but an integral structural element upon which the narrative revolves.

An actant can also be described as a binary opposition pairing, such as a hero paired with a villain, a dragon paired with a dragon-slaying sword, a helper paired with an opponent. Actantial relationships are therefore incredibly useful in generating problems within a narrative that have to be overcome, providing contrast, or in defining an antagonistic force within the narrative. However, the same character can simultaneously have a different actant (or way of concern) in regard to a different sequence of action, event, or episode in the story. Therefore, it should be distinguished from a character's consistent role in the story like the archetype of a character. The concept of actant is important in structuralism of narratology to regard each situation as the minimum independent unit of story.

[Linguistically], actants have a kind of phonemic rather than a phonetic role: they operate on the level of function, rather than content. That is, an actant may embody itself in a particular character (termed an acteur) or it may reside in the function of more than one character in respect of their common role in the story's underlying "oppositional" structure. In short, the deep structure of the narrative generates and defines its actants at a level beyond that of the story's surface content.

— Terence Hawkes, Structuralism and Semiotics (Berkeley: University of California Press, 1977), p. 89

=== As defined by Julia Kristeva ===
In 1969, Julia Kristeva also attempted to understand the dynamic development of the situations in narratives with Greimas's actantial model. She thought the subject and the object can exchange positions, and accordingly the supporter and the opponent can exchange positions too. Furthermore, the pair of subject and object sometimes exchanges its position with the pair of supporter and opponent. There are, however, multiple overlapping situations in narrative at a given time. To contend with the overlapping situations present in all narrative structure, she called the potential actant shifts not "change", but "transformation." This should not be confused with Greimas's own transformational model, another narratological framework.

=== As defined by Vladimir Propp ===
Independently, researching Russian folklores, Vladimir Propp also provided the "7 act spheres":

1. Aggressor
2. Donor
3. Auxiliary
4. Princess and the father
5. Committer
6. Hero
7. Bogus hero

However, these are not the types of the person in the story, but rather patterns of behavior: the same person may sometimes act as one "sphere", and at other times as a different "sphere".

== In linguistics ==
Linguist Lucien Tesnière considered the function of a verb as most important in dependency grammar and invented the term "actant", various persons that accompany a verb:

1. "prime actant", the nominative case
2. "second actant", the accusative case
3. "third actant", the dative case

This concept of actant is similar to that of argument.

Algirdas Julien Greimas redefined actants as the 3 pairs "Modulations":

1. The Actant-Subject and the Actant-Object of Action.
2. The Actant-Sender and the Actant-Receiver of Information
3. The Actant-Supporter and the Actant-Oppositionist of Volition.

== In sociology ==
In sociology, the semiotic term "actant" was incorporated into the actor–network theory by Bruno Latour and Michel Callon, the activity of which is described as "mediation" or "translation".

== In astrology ==
Since ancient times, astrology considered and analyzed the position of the persons concerning a situation with the symbols of the celestial objects and constellations. Georges Polti counted up the needed positions in his famous The Thirty-Six Dramatic Situations. Étienne Souriau reduced them to only 6 positions named "dramaturgic functions" with astrological symbols:

1. "The Leo", the thematic powered.
2. "The Sun", the valued.
3. "The Earth", the wished obtainer.
4. "The Mars", the oppositionist.
5. "The Libra", the judge of the situation.
6. "The Moon", Auxiliary.
