= Jean-Marie Klinkenberg =

Belgian linguist and semiotician (born 1944)

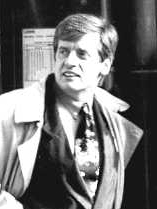
Jean-Marie Klinkenberg in 1991

Jean-Marie Klinkenberg (born 8 October 1944) is a Belgian linguist and semiotician, professor at the State University of Liège, born in Verviers (Belgium) in 1944. Member of the interdisciplinary Groupe μ. President of the International Association for visual Semiotics.

== Biography ==
Jean-Marie Klinkenberg, born in 1944 in Verviers (Belgium), received his Masters (1967) and his Doctorate (1971) in Romance Philology at the State University of Liège. He teaches language studies at the University of Liège, focusing on rhetoric and semiotics. He also teaches French-language literature (particularly Belgian and Québécois).

His scientific activities focus on two areas: linguistics/semiotics and French-speaking cultures. In the first area, he made his mark in the late 1960s by revitalizing the field of rhetoric as a member of the interdisciplinary team known as the μ Group. More recently, he has helped to steer semiotics in a social, cognitivist direction. His writings on semiotics and rhetoric have been translated into 15 or more languages.

In the second field, he has modernized the study of the arts in Belgium by casting them in a social and institutional light, an approach that can be readily transferred to the other French-speaking cultures he has studied (such as Quebec's) and by establishing inter-university research programs. He founded and chairs Belgium's Centre d'Études des Lettres Francophones.

He is president of the International Association for visual semiotics.

He is a member of the "Ordre des francophones d'Amérique" (Quebec) and Commandeur des Arts et Lettres (France).

Member of the "Académie royale de Belgique" (Royal Academy of Belgium).

== Bibliography ==
- 1970 Rhétorique générale, Paris, Larousse (paperback : Paris, Le Seuil,1982); with the Groupe μ. (A General Rhetoric, Baltimore & London, The Johns Hopkins University Press, transl. by Paul B. Burrell & Edgar M. Slotkin, 1981).
- 1973 Style et Archaïsme dans La Légende d'Ulenspiegel de Charles De Coster, Brussels, Palais des Académies.
- 1977 Rhétorique de la poésie : lecture linéaire, lecture tabulaire, Brussels, Complexe (paperback : Paris, Le Seuil, 1990); with the Groupe μ.
- 1978 Collages, Paris, U.G.E.; with the Groupe μ.
- 1979 A Semiotic Landscape. Panorama sémiotique, The Hague, Mouton; with Seymour Chatman & Umberto Eco.
- 1979 Rhétoriques, Sémiotiques, Paris, U.G.E; with the Groupe μ.
- 1980 La littérature française de Belgique, Paris, Nathan, Brussels, Labor.
- 1981 Langages et collectivités : le cas du Québec, Montréal, Leméac; with D. Latin et G. Connolly.
- 1985 Trajectoires : littérature et institutions au Québec et en Belgique francophone, Presses universitaires de Montréal, Brussels, Labor; with Lise Gauvin.
- 1985 Charles De Coster, Brussels, Labor.
- 1988 French adaptation of Le Signe. Introduction à un concept et à son histoire, by Umberto Eco, Brussels, Labor (paperback : Le livre de poche, 1992).
- 1988 Raymond Queneau, André Blavier : lettres croisées (1949-1976), Brussels, Labor, .
- 1990 Le sens rhétorique. Essais de sémantique littéraire, Toronto, G.R.E.F., Brussels, Les Éperonnniers.
- 1991 Écrivain cherche lecteur. L’écrivain francophone et ses publics, Paris, Créaphis, Montréal, V.L.B.; with Lise Gauvin.
- 1992 Traité du signe visuel. Pour une rhétorique de l'image, Paris, Le Seuil; avec le Groupe μ.
- 1994 Espace Nord. L’Anthologie, Brussels, Labor.
- 1994 Des Langues romanes, Louvain-la-Neuve, Duculot.
- 1996 Sept leçons de sémiotique et de rhétorique, Toronto, G.R.E.F.
- 1997 Une langue, une communauté. Le français en Belgique, Louvain-la-Neuve, Duculot; with Daniel Blampain, André Goosse, Marc Wilmet.
- 1997 Salut Galarneau !, de Jacques Godbout, Montréal, Boréal.
- 1997 Précis de sémiotique générale, Duculot (paperback : Paris, Le Seuil, 2000).
- 2000 Tu parles !? Le français dans tous ses états, Paris, Flammarion (rééd. 2002, coll. Champs); with Bernard Cerquiglini, Jean-Claude Corbeil, Benoît Peeters.
- 2001 La langue et le citoyen. Pour une autre politique de la langue française, Paris, Presses universitaires de France.
- 2003 Figuras, conocimiento, cultura. Ensayos retóricos, Mexico City, Universidad Nacional Autónoma; with the Groupe μ.
- 2003 Petites mythologies belges, Brussels, Labor.
- 2005 La littérature belge. Précis d'histoire sociale, Brussels, Labor; with Benoît Denis.
- 2008 (editor) Figures de la figure: Sémiotique et rhétorique générale
- 2008 (editor) L’avenir du français (with Jacques Maurais, Pierre Dumont, Bruno Maurer, Patrick Chardenet), Paris, Agence universitaire de la Francophonie, Édition des archives contemporaines.
- 2010 Le Tournant des années 1970. Liège en effervescence (with Nancy Delhalle & Jacques Dubois), Brussels, Les Impressions nouvelles.
- 2010 Périphériques Nord. Fragments d'une histoire sociale de la littérature francophone en Belgique, Presses de l'Université de Liège.
- 2010 Voir faire. Faire voir, Brussels, Les Impressions nouvelles.
- 2015 La Langue dans la cité. Vivre et penser l'équité culturelle, Brussels, Les Impressions nouvelles, 2015.
- 2016 Petites mythologies liégeoises (avec Laurent Demoulin), Liège, Tétras Lyre, 2016.
- 2017 Definitive edition of Charles De Coster, La Légende et les aventures héroïques, joyeuses et glorieuses d’Ulenspiegel et de Lamme Goedzak au pays de Flandre et ailleurs, established by Jean-Marie Klinkenberg, Brussels, Communauté française de Belgique, Collection Espace Nord, 2017.
- 2018 Politiques linguistiques en Belgique francophone et germanophone, spécial issue of Synergies.
- 2018 Entre langue et espace. Qu’est-ce que l’écriture ?, Brussels, Académie royale de Belgique (coll. « L’Académie en poche », 111), .
- 2018 (Essais en) Sémiotique de l’écriture. (Studies in the) Semiotics of Writing, special issue Signata. Annales des sémiotiques. Annal of Semiotics, n° 9, 2018 (avec Stéphane Polis).
- 2020 Votre langue est à vous. Quarante ans de politique linguistique en Belgique francophone, Louvain-la-Neuve, EME Éditions, Fédération Wallonie-Bruxelles, Service de la langue française (coll. Français & Société, 31).
