= International Association for Semiotic Studies =

World organisation of semioticians

International Association for Semiotic Studies (Association Internationale de Sémiotique, IASS-AIS) is the major world organisation of semioticians, established in 1969.

Founding members of the association include Algirdas Julien Greimas, Roman Jakobson, Julia Kristeva, Emile Benveniste, André Martinet, Roland Barthes, Umberto Eco, Thomas A. Sebeok, and Juri Lotman.

The official journal of the association is Semiotica, published by De Gruyter Mouton. The working languages of the association are English and French.

The Executive Committee of the IASS (le Comité Directeur de l’AIS) consists of the representatives from semiotic societies of member countries (two from each).

== World congresses in semiotics ==
The association is regularly organising the world congresses in semiotics:

1. Milan, Italy, June 2–6, 1974 (A Semiotic Landscape)
2. Vienna, Austria, July 2–6, 1979 (Semiotics Unfolding)
3. Palermo, Italy, June 24–29, 1984 (Semiotic Theory and Practice)
4. Barcelona, Spain, and Perpignan, France, March 31 – April 4, 1989 (Signs of Humanity/L’homme et ses signes)
5. Berkeley, USA, June 12–18, 1994 (Signs of the World. Synthesis in Diversity)
6. Guadalajara, Mexico, July 13–18, 1997 (Semiotics Bridging Nature and Culture/La sémiotique: carrefour de la nature et de la culture/La semiotica. Intersección de la naturaleza y de la cultura)
7. Dresden, Germany, October 6–11, 1999 (Sign Processes in Complex Systems/Zeichenprozesse in komplexen Systemen)
8. Lyon, France, July 7–12, 2004 (Signes du monde. Interculturalité et globalisation / Signs of the World. Interculturality and Globalization / Zeichen der Welt: Interkulturalität und Globalisierung / Los signos del mundo: Interculturalidad y Globalización)
9. Helsinki and Imatra, Finland, June 11–17, 2007 (Understanding/Misunderstanding)
10. A Coruña, Spain, September 22–26, 2009 (Culture of Communication/Communication of Culture) See
11. Nanjing, China, October 5–9, 2012 (Global Semiotics: Bridging Different Civilizations) See
12. Sofia, Bulgaria, September 16–20, 2014 (New Semiotics: Between Tradition and Innovation) See
13. Kaunas, Lithuania, June 26–30, 2017 (Cross-Inter-Multi-Trans) See
14. Buenos Aires, Argentina, September 9–13, 2019 (Trajectories) See
15. Thessaloniki, Greece, August 30 – September 3, 2022 (Semiotics in the Lifeworld) See
16. Warsaw, Poland, September 2–6, 2024 (Signs and Realities) See

== Presidents ==
The list of the presidents of the association include

- Emile Benveniste (1969–1974)
- Cesare Segre (1974–1984)
- Jerzy Pelc (1984–1994)
- Roland Posner (1994–2004)
- Eero Tarasti (2004–2014)
- Paul Cobley (2014–2024)
- Jacques Fontanille (since 2024)

The former presidents are also honorary presidents. In addition, there are two elected honorary presidents: Umberto Eco and Gloria Withalm.

== See also ==
- International Society for Biosemiotic Studies
- Semiotic Society of America
- International Association for Visual Semiotics
