= Visual semiotics =

Studies of meaning evolve from semiotics, a philosophical approach that seeks to interpret messages in terms of signs and patterns of symbolism. Contemporary semiotics consists of two branches originating contemporaneously in late 19th century France and the United States. Originating in literary and linguistic contexts, one branch (referred to as semiology) originated from the work of Swiss linguist Ferdinand Saussure. The second branch expands on the work of American pragmatist philosopher Charles Sanders Peirce.

A sign can be a word, sound, a touch or visual image. Saussure divides a sign into two components: the signifier, which is the sound, image, or word, and the signified, which is the concept or meaning the signifier represents. For Saussure, the relation between the signifier and the signified is arbitrary and conventional. In other words, signs can mean anything we agree that they mean, as well as mean different things to different people.

Peircean semiotics works from a different notion of what a sign is. A sign is something that stands for something else (the sign's object) to a receptive mind. The effect the sign has on the receiving mind is called the interpretant. Note that the interpretant may not be identical to the sign's object (something we call a "mis-understanding") but we are eternally prevented from assurance of this match or mismatch because the only way we have of verifying the match is to use additional signs.

In Peircean semiotics, signs that have an arbitrary or conventional relation to their objects are called symbols. But there are two other kinds of sign-object relations which are not completely arbitrary: icons are signs that resemble their objects, and indexes are signs that relate to their objects by some actual contact or environmental contiguity.

== Groupe μ ==
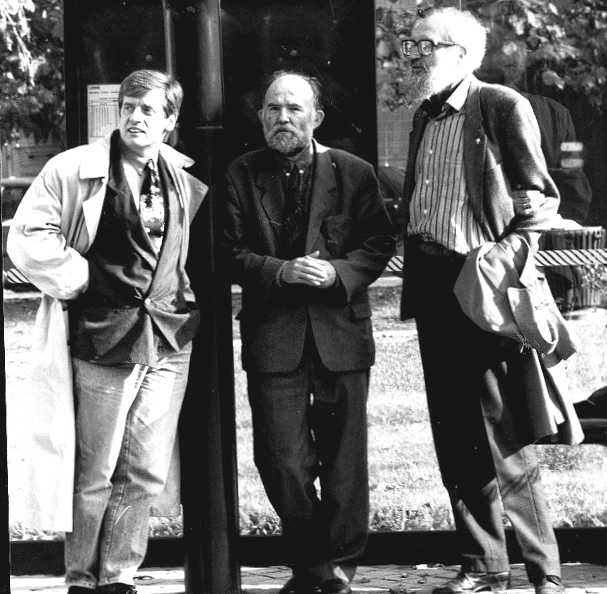
The Mu Group μ in 1991 : J.-M. Klinkenberg, P. Minguet, F. Edeline.

The Belgian Groupe μ ("Mu Group"), founded in 1967, developed a structural, cognition-based study of visual semiotics and visual rhetoric.

Most signs operate on several levels—iconic as well as symbolic and/or indexical. This suggests that visual semiotic analysis may be addressing a hierarchy of meaning in addition to categories and components of meaning. As Umberto Eco explains, "what is commonly called a 'message' is in fact a text whose content is a multilevel discourse".

Whether the analyst works from a Saussurean or a Peircean perspective, semiotic analysis of visual texts involves taking apart the various levels of visual signs to understand how the parts contribute to the meaning of the whole.

The broadening concept of text and discourse encourages additional research into how visual communication operates to create meaning. Deely explains that "at the heart of semiotics is the realization that the whole of human experience, without exception, is an interpretive structure mediated and sustained by signs". Semiotics now considers a variety of texts, using Eco's terms, to investigate such diverse areas as movies, art, advertisements, and fashion, as well as visuals. In other words, as Berger explains, "the essential breakthrough of semiology is to take linguistics as a model and apply linguistic concepts to other phenomena--texts--and not just to language itself." Anthropologists like Grant McCracken and marketing experts like Sydney Levy have even used semiotic interpretations to analyze the rich cultural meanings of products and consumer consumption behaviors as texts.

Visual texts are an important area of analysis for semioticians and particularly for scholars working with visually intensive forms such as advertising and television because images are such a central part of our mass communication sign system. Linda Scott has deconstructed the images in perfume advertising as well as in Apple's "1984" commercial using close readings of the various messages that can be interpreted from the ads. Shay Sayre has also looked at perfume advertising images and the visual rhetoric in Hungary's first free election television advertisements using semiotic analysis. Also using semiotics, Arthur Asa Berger has deconstructed the meaning of the "1984" commercial as well as programs such as Cheers and films such as Murder on the Orient Express.

Systems of meaning, Culler and Berger tells us, are analyzed by looking at cultural and communication products and events as signs and then by analysing the relationship between these signs. The categories of signs and the relationships between them create a system. Barthes, for example, has analyzed the "fashion system," and classified the system of communication through fashion into two categories: image clothing and descriptive clothing. Likewise, an advertisement has its own system of meaning. We expect an appeal to purchase, either directly or implied, to be made and a product to be shown, for example, as part of the advertising system.

In their book Discourses in Place: Language in the material world, Ron Scollon and Suzie Wong Scollon note that visual semiotics has to do with turning "from the spoken, face-to-face discourses to the representations of that interaction order in images and signs" (82). Interaction order involves the various social interactions that takes place in any setting, such as being alone, being with a companion, at a meeting, watching a show etc., and it "is almost always complex", with various interactions occurring at once (83). When it comes to images, says Scollon and Wong, there are also multiple relationships. These include the relationships between the components of a visual image, the relationships between the producers of the visual image, the relationships between the producers and the components, as well as the relationships between the components of an image and those who are viewing it. That's are the main point.

This interaction order has four main semiotic systems, says Scollon and Wong. These include represented participants, modality, composition and interactive participants. Represented participants are elements of a visual image, and are either narrative ("present unfolding actions and events or... processes of change") or conceptual ("show abstract, comparative or generalized categories") (Scollon and Wong 86). Modality is how true to reality a visual image is, and main indicators include color saturation, color differentiation, depth, illumination and brightness, among others. With modality, it is often found "that truth, veracity, or sincerity might be expressed in very different ways from one society to another," with Western cultures favoring naturalistic representation, or as true to seeing it in person as possible (Scollon and Wong 89-90).

Composition is the way in which represented participants within a visual image are arranged in relation to one another, with the three main systems of compositions being ideal-real(top to bottom), given-new(left to right), and center-margin relationships (Scollon and Wong 92). So for example, when reading a menu at a fast food restaurant, the given information would be something such as "hamburger", and the new information would be the price, read left to right and recognized in that order. As mentioned above, interactive participants, explain Scollon and Wong, are the various relationships that occur around a visual image, such as those between the producers of the image and the represented participants in that image. In this way, these four components work together to help convey the meaning of signs and symbols.

== Association of Visual Semiotics ==
The International Association of Visual Semiotics was formed in 1989. The Association, being of an international nature, recognizes three official languages: English, French, and Spanish. The Association is in French and Spanish: Association Internationale de Sémiotique Visuelle and El Asociación Internacional de Semiótica Visual, respectively.

Congresses have been held in Blois (France) 1989, Bilbao (Spain) 1992, Berkeley (California, USA) 1994, São Paulo (Brazil) 1996, Siena (Italy) 1999, Québec (Canada) 2001, Mexico city 2003, Lyon (France) 2004, Istanbul (Turkey) 2007, Venice (Italy) 2010, and Buenos Aires (Argentina) 2012.

- President: José Luis Caivano (University of Buenos Aires, Argentina)
- General Secretary: Göran Sonesson (University of Lund, Sweden).

Previous Presidents: Jean-Marie Klinkenberg (2001-2012), Paolo Fabbri (1998-2001), Ana Claudia de Oliveira (1996-1998), Jacques Fontanille (1994-1996), Fernande Saint-Martin (1990-1994), Michel Costantini (1989-1990).

Visual Semiotics are also associated with that of Film, Fashion and Advertising. it is suggested that the use of semiotics in films are used to connote a specific underlying theme like that of the nuclear bomb in Godzilla.

== See also ==
- Theory of painting
- Symbolic interactionism
