= Actantial model =

Tool used in structural semantics

In structural semantics, the actantial model, also called the actantial narrative schema, is a tool used to analyze the action that takes place in a story, whether real or fictional. It was developed in 1966 by semiotician Algirdas Julien Greimas.

The model considers an action as divided into six facets, called actants. Those actants are a combined framework inspired mainly between Vladimir Propp's and Étienne Souriau's actantial theories.

Greimas took the term actant from linguist Lucien Tesnière, who coined the term in his discussion of the grammar of noun phrases.

== Basic summary ==
Greimas' actantial model distinguishes characters and action elements according to their function within the plot.

The model differentiates between

- Subject / Object
- Helper / Opponent
- Sender / Receiver
- Power

The subject desires a usually abstract object. The helper supports the subject in obtaining the object. The opponent, however, works against the helper and tries to prevent the subject from gaining the object. The sender initiates the action and the receiver profits from the action and/or the object. Whether or not the subject will acquire the desired object depends on the abstract power often connected to the subject. Analysing characters according to the actantial model enables a detailed breakdown of the characters' function within the plot but also creates a simplified character constellation in association with the action.

== See also ==
- Semiotic square
- Vladimir Propp

== Sources ==
- Greimas, Algirdas Julien. 1973. "Actants, Actors, and Figures." On Meaning: Selected Writings in Semiotic Theory. Trans. Paul J. Perron and Frank H, Collins. Theory and History of Literature, 38. Minneapolis: U of Minnesota P, 1987. 106–120.
- Herbert, Louis (2006) Tools for Text and Image Analysis: An Introduction to Applied Semiotics, online ebook, published by Texto !
- Herbert, Louis (2006) The Actantial Model, in Louis Hébert (dir.), Signo [online], Rimouski (Quebec), http://www.signosemio.com
