= Semiotic square =

Tool for structural analysis

Semiotic square

The semiotic square, also known as the Greimas square, is a tool used in structural analysis of the relationships between semiotic signs through the opposition of concepts, such as feminine-masculine or beautiful-ugly, and of extending the relevant ontology.

The semiotic square, derived from Aristotle's logical square of opposition, was developed by Algirdas J. Greimas, a Lithuanian-French linguist and semiotician, who considered the semiotic square to be the elementary structure of meaning.

Greimas first presented the square in Semantique Structurale (1966), a book which was later published as Structural Semantics: An Attempt at a Method (1983). He further developed the semiotic square with Francois Rastier in "The Interaction of Semiotic Constraints" (1968).

== Basic structure ==
The Greimas square is a model based on relationships:

| Structure | Relationship Type | Relationship Elements |
|---|---|---|
| Complex | Contrary | S_{1} + S_{2} |
| Neutral | Contrary | ~S_{2} + ~S_{1} |
| Schema 1 | Contradiction | S_{1} + ~S_{1} |
| Schema 2 | Contradiction | S_{2} + ~S_{2} |
| Deixes 1 | Implication | ~S_{2} + S_{1} |
| Deixes 2 | Implication | ~S_{1} + S_{2} |

- S_{1} = positive seme
- S_{2} = negative seme
- S = complex axis (S_{1} + S_{2})
- ~S = neutral axis (neither S_{1} nor S_{2})
1. The semiotic square is formed by an initial binary relationship between two contrary signs. S_{1}is considered to be the affirmation/positive element and S_{2} is the negation/negative element in the binary pair.
2. The second binary relationship is now created on the ~S axis. ~S_{1} is considered to be the complex term, and ~S_{2} is the neutral term. This is where the principle of difference is brought into play: every element in a system is defined by its differences from the other elements.
3. In most modes of interpretation, the S-axis is a hyponym of the ~S-axis. The ~S_{1} element combines aspects of S_{1} and S_{2} and is also contradictory to S_{1} . The ~S_{2} element contains aspects of neither S_{1} nor S_{2}.
4. Finally, the ~S_{2} element can be identified. Considered to be "always the most critical position and the one that remains open or empty the longest time, for its identification completes the process and in that sense constitutes the most creative act of the construction."

== Example ==
Starting from a given opposition of concepts S1 and S2, the semiotic square entails first the existence of two other concepts, namely ~S1 and ~S2, which are in the following relationships:

- S1 and S2: opposition
- S1 and ~S1, S2 and ~S2: contradiction
- S1 and ~S2, S2 and ~S1: complementarity

The semiotic square also produces, second, so-called meta-concepts, which are compound ones, the most important of which are:

- both S1 and S2
- neither S1 nor S2

For example, from the pair of opposite concepts masculine-feminine, we get:

- S1: masculine
- S2: feminine
- ~S1: not-masculine
- ~S2: not-feminine
- both S1 and S2: masculine and feminine
- neither S1 nor S2: neither masculine nor feminine

== Styles of interpretation ==
The Greimas square is a tool used within the system of semiotics.

- As such, one form of interpretation is to look at each of the elements: S1, S2, ~S1, and ~S2 as either developed by Ferdinand de Saussure (bi-modal) or Charles Sanders Peirce (tripartite) sign.
- In the Peircean system of semiotics, the interpretant becomes the representamen for another, interrelated sign. In this same way, each of the elements of the semiotic square (S1, S2, ~S1, and ~S2) can become an element in a new, interrelated square.
- Finally, Greimas suggests placing semiotic squares of associated meaning on top of one another to create a layered effect and another form of analysis and interpretation.

== Examples of interpretation ==
The semiotic square has been used to analyze and interpret a variety of topics, including corporate language, the discourse of science studies as cultural studies, the fable of Little Red Riding Hood, narration, and print advertising.
