= Roland Posner =

German semiotician and linguist (1942–2020)

Roland Posner (30 June 1942 in Prague – 26 May 2020 in Berlin) was a German semiotician and linguist.

He was Professor of Technische Universität Berlin since 1974.

He was editor-in-chief of the Zeitschrift für Semiotik and an editor of a major 4-volume handbook in semiotics. He was the President of the International Association for Semiotic Studies in 1994–2004. He was one of founders of the International Society for Gesture Studies.

== Selected publications ==
- Posner, Roland 1982. Rational Discourse and Poetic Communication: Methods of Linguistic, Literary, and Philosophical Analysis. Berlin: Mouton.
- Posner, Roland (ed.) 1990. Warnungen an die ferne Zukunft: Atommüll als Kommunikationsproblem. Raben.
- Jorna, Rene; Heusden, Barend van; Posner, Ronald (eds.) 1993. Signs, Search and Communication: Semiotic Aspects of Artificial Intelligence. Berlin: Walter de Gruyter.
- Posner, Roland 2000. Semiotic pollution: Deliberations towards an ecology of signs. Sign Systems Studies 28: 290–308.
- Posner, Roland 2011. Eight historical paradigms of the human sciences. In: Peil, Tiina (ed.), The Space of Culture – the Place of Nature in Estonia and Beyond. (Approaches to Culture Theory 1.) Tartu: Tartu University Press, 20–38.
