= Claude Zilberberg =

French semiotician (1938–2018)

- Born: Claude Zilberberg; 26 May 1938; Paris, France
- Died: 12 October 2018 (aged 80); Saint-Maur-des-Fossés, France
- Occupation: Professor
- Organization: Paris Intersemiotic Seminar
- Known for: Semiotician, Tensive modelling

Claude Zilberberg (26 May 1938 – 12 October 2018), Docteur d'État, was a semiotician, former co-director of the Paris Intersemiotic Seminar.

== Work ==
For more than 20 years, Claude Zilberberg analysed the effects of applying tensive modelling (which he introduced, with Jacques Fontanille) as an overlay onto the foundation of Greimasian semiotic theory.
