= A General Rhetoric =

1970 book

- Cover page of the English version published in 1981
- Author: Groupe μ
- Publication date: 1970

A General Rhetoric is a 1970 book by the Belgian semioticians known as Groupe μ. The first part of the book reformulates classical rhetoric within semiotics, while the second part discusses the new concept of a general rhetoric, which introduces rhetorical figures for storytelling, called figures of narration.

It became a classic of human sciences and has been translated in more than 20 languages.

== Figures of narration ==
Groupe μ categorized the figures of narration are following Hjelmslev's sign model, and included in the analysis of each group the perspective of two fundamental aspects of Quintilian's classical rhetoric: the principle of deviation from a norm, and the four fundamental operations for such of variation.

Hjelmslev distinguished between the expression plane and the content plane, and then further between form and substance. Moreover, Hjelmslev's considered the "internal structure of language" to be a system of figurae, which he considered, instead of the sign, to be the ultimate semiotic unity. His analysis distinguished between expression-figurae (or figurae of the expression plane) and content-figurae, and then within each between form and content. Groupe μ's essay discusses figures of the substance of expression , figures of the form of expression, and figures of form of content. They avoid discussion the figures of the substance of content, wondering if they are actually conceivable, and leave them to future works building a universal theory of semantics.

For the figures of the substance of expression they make the examples of diction in speech and the font of a written text. Following a quote from Hjelmslev, they define variations in the substance of expression as variation in the modalities of the physical medium. For speech, they make examples of possible different modalities of enunciation of a text, like reading it with monotone diction, with emphatic diction, or singing it, which are all variations from the established "norm" of reading text "normally". For written text, whose substance is graphic, the modalities of variation of the substance of expression include handwriting and fonts. In printing a book, it is possible to choose among several fonts: in the final results, the physical medium and substance will be the same, they will just have different modalities.

Regarding the definition of form of expression, one of the examples given is syntactic play.

== Editions ==
- 1970, original French edition published by Larousse
- 1981, English translation by Paul B. Burrell and Edgar M. Slotkin. Johns Hopkins University Press
- 1982, paperback edition, published by Seuil (collection "Points").
