= Manifesto for Walloon culture =

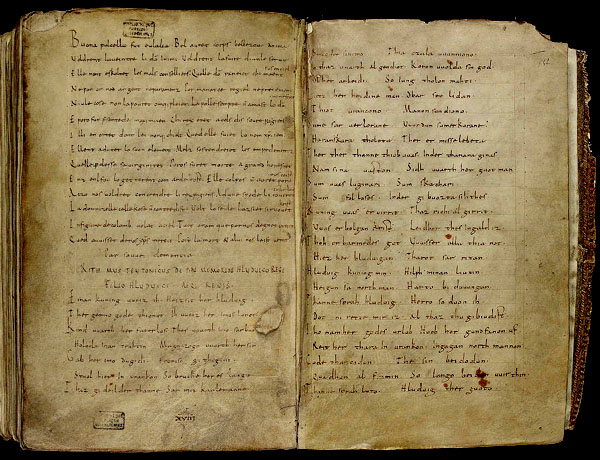
Sequence of Saint Eulalia

The Manifesto for Walloon Culture (French: Manifeste pour la culture wallonne) was a document published on September 15, 1983, in Liège, Belgium. Signed by 75 prominent figures from the artistic, journalistic, and academic communities of Wallonia, the manifesto aimed to promote Walloon culture and identity.

== Walloon Language and Identity ==
The Flemish journalist, Guido Fonteyn, described it as a Walloon awakening.

For Dimitrios Karmis and Alain Gagnon, on the road to cultural self-assertion this manifesto has marked a powerful moment.

For Emmanuelle Labeau, Arthur Masson's novels before the period of the Manifesto (Masson died in 1970), are located in Wallonia,

not only a provincial region, it is also a different country from one that possesses linguistic legitimacy : France. It is worth noting that a positive image -relying on affective and non linguistic qualities – is given of this peripheral region. On the other hand, the novels are intended to obtain literary recognition by exploiting the exoticism of this milieu [...] In his writings, Masson manages to convey the ambivalent attitude of educated Francophone Belgium: regional varieties of French are felt to have positive affective features but lack sophistication. By dividing his writings between two areas – his character's language which unshamefully uses regional features and his own language, which aims at neutrality – Masson tried to resolve the tensions of a national linguistic inferiority complex.

—

The regional varieties of French are not necessarily the Walloon dialect but Philip Mosley wrote:

Walloon dialect has carried neither official status as a language in administrative, ecclesiastical, or political affairs, nor sufficient weight to act as a popular and influential vehicle for the expression of Walloon cultural identity. This latter task has fallend instead in the last thirty years to politically conscious writers in French who published for instance a Manifesto for Walloon culture

—

== Criticism from Brussels ==
This Manifesto was violently criticized in Brussels:

In Brussels, despite the federalization process the unitary vision historically characteristic of the Franco-Bruxellois still seems to have some hold. In the eyes of many Franco-Bruxellois, the country is far from the picture proposed by the Manifeste pour la culture wallonne. Home of the EU Commission, Capital of Belgium and bastion of pan-Belgian nationalism since 1830, Brussels tends to be contemptuous of Walloon and Flemish identities, which are considered too particularistic in the context of the European integration. Brussels pan-Belgian nationalism has professed moral superiority and has often conceived of itself as the path toward a more universal belonging, in a perspective similar to Trudeau's vision...

—

== Further response ==
According to Michael Keating, John Loughlin, and Kris Deschouwer in 2003: The "single French culture" is still the official discourse, and is defended by the French community authorities (...) The Walloon movement of today, supported by a small number of intellectual elites, defends very much the typical Walloon difference, but has not been able to mobilize for it.

The Brussels Manifesto was a document published in December 2006 that called for the regionalization of the French Community of Belgium. Similar in spirit to the 1983 Walloon Manifesto, it advocated for increased autonomy for both Wallonia and Brussels within the French Community.

The manifesto was signed by prominent figures from Brussels, including philosophers Philippe Van Parijs and Jean-Marc Ferry. Its publication served as a reminder of the long-standing demands of Walloon "regionalists" who, since the 1983 manifesto, had called for the dissolution of the French Community and the transfer of its competencies, particularly in education and culture, to the Walloon Region.

Benoît Lechat summarized the issue:

Although the cultural aspect was already present in the “renardisme”, it was with the Manifeste pour la culture wallonne that culture truly became a priority within the Walloon culture. Conversely, some defenders of the French-speaking community have supported the idea of a fusion between the Walloon Region and the French-speaking Community. It’s the argument of the “French-speaking Nation” defended at the time by the president of the PRL, Jean Gol, and others who blamed the regionalists of “falling back on" a Walloon identity. Recently a Brussels regionalism has arisen, in particular through the association “Manifesto” which advocates the development of educational and cultural policies adapted to the needs of the Brussels Region. The Walloon and Brussels regionalists privilege an institutional system based on three Regions with equal levels of autonomy and power. The Flemish movement has always preferred a system composed of two main regions, Flanders and Wallonia, for the joint rule of the Brussels Region.

—

The Manifesto for Walloon Culture concludes with a two-pronged statement regarding inclusivity and regional identity. Firstly, it posits that all those who live and work in Wallonia are undeniably part of the region. This suggests a broad definition of Walloon identity that extends beyond ethnicity or language. Secondly, the manifesto emphasizes that a range of respectable ideas and beliefs contribute to Wallonia's character. This implies a desire for tolerance and openness within the region.

== New debates ==
The Walloon Minister President started a debate about the Walloon identity on 1 March 2010 in the newspaper La Meuse. He made a proposal to his government to rename the 'Walloon Region' as 'Wallonia'. The director of the Institut Destrée commented on this initiative the day after on the RTBF. He linked this initiative and the Manifesto for Walloon culture together:

Everybody who is an inhabitant of Wallonia is a Walloon and that's the spirit of the Manifesto for Walloon Culture of 1983. That's the great difference between the debate in France about the national identity and our debate.

—

Le Figaro (4 March 2010) reminds the last sentences of the Manifesto for Walloon Culture : 'All those who live and work in the Walloon region are undeniably part of Wallonia.' These sentences are hopefully a reason to hope a peaceful debate...'

Criticism about this new debate appears both in Wallonia and Brussels, but perhaps mainly in the Brussels' Newspapers. For instance Pascal Lorent in Le Soir 4 March 2010 writes: 'The Walloon identity doesn't exist'. And Pierre Bouillon wrote in Le Soir 6 March 2010 that the Walloon identity refers mainly to tourism, unemployment and bribery in Charleroi. It seems that the dispute between Brussels and Wallonia about this issue remains as for instance Europe since 1945: an encyclopedia, Tome I wrote it for some years: 'A Walloon identity is also emerging that exhibits at the political level the still mainly hidden tension between French-speaking Brussels and Wallonia' On the contrary, it seems to Paul Piret, journalist at La Libre Belgique, a debate on the concept 'Identity' is good about political citizenship, roots, collective project and even pride.

Bouli Lanners said that his films are the reflection of the Walloon culture but with an American inspiration because we are overflowed by the American culture

== See also ==
- Culture of Belgium
