= Groupe μ =

Group of scientists

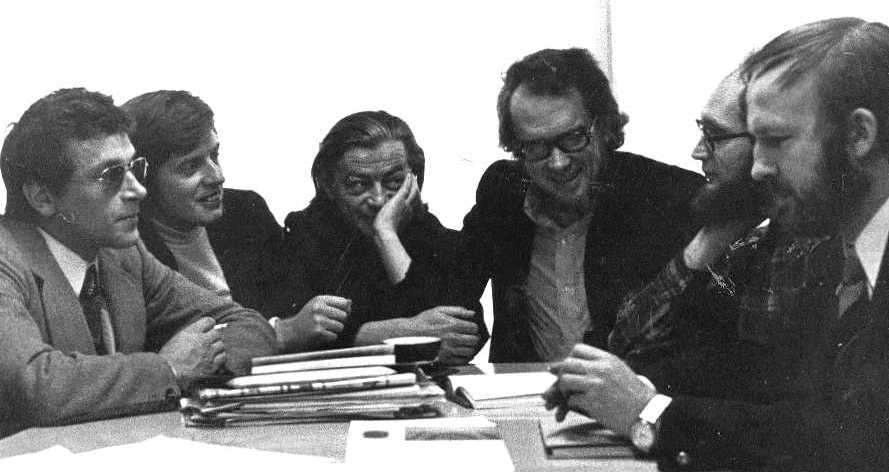
Members of Groupe μ in 1970: F. Pire, J.-M. Klinkenberg, H. Trinon, J. Dubois, F. Edeline, P. Minguet (left to right).

Groupe μ (French for "Group μ") is the collective pseudonym under which a group of Belgian 20th-century semioticians wrote a series of books, presenting an exposition of modern semiotics.

== Research and work ==
This interdisciplinary group works out of the Center of Poetic Studies at the University of Liège, in Belgium, and was formed in 1967. Members have included Francis Édeline, Jean-Marie Klinkenberg, Jacques Dubois, Francis Pire, Hadelin Trinon and Philippe Minguet, with several other associate members. Beyond their personal research in biochemistry, cultural sociology, aesthetics, or semiotics, the authors have published collectively various books as well as more than sixty papers in such journals as Communications, Poétique, Versus, Visio, Degrés, Cahiers internationaux de symbolisme, Communication et langage, Era, Revue d'esthétique, Le Français moderne, Texte, Technê, Protée, RS/SI, Nouveaux actes sémiotiques, Les Documents de travail d'Urbino, etc. or in collected papers.

Some of their early work in the 1960s dealt with linguistically oriented topics such as polysemous language, and the nature of synecdoche and metaphor. The concepts elaborated in the group's first major publication (A General Rhetoric 1970) contributed to the revival of rhetorics at the time, by providing an explanatory model of rhetorical figures, which drew on contemporary concepts of linguistic structure. The group separated itself even further from formal structuralism with the publication of A Rhetoric of Poetry (1977), which showed that, although the presence of certain linguistic structures – and foremost amongst them poly-isotopy, made possible by rhetorical figures – was a necessary condition for the production of poetic effects, this condition was not enough, and that anthropological and social criteria would be needed to complete these structures.

In the 1970s and 1980s they worked on developing a theoretical approach towards visual rhetoric and visual semiotics that involved classifying images according to their differences from plastic and iconic norms.

The Traité du signe visuel (1992) (which Göran Sonesson said was to visual communication what Saussure's Cours de linguistique générale was to linguistics) sought to elaborate a general grammar of the image, independently of the type of corpus being considered. This semiotic of the visual contributed, in its turn, to semiotics in general: indeed, a question encountered by the group at this stage was that of the relationship between sensorial experience and signification, a question which certainly reveals something of this degree of generality since it comes up against the question of the origin of meaning itself.

The group took its name from the metaphor, μ being the Greek initial for the term.

== Bibliography ==
- A General Rhetoric (1970)
- Rhétorique de la poésie : lecture linéaire, lecture tabulaire (1977)
- Collages (1978)
- Plan d'une rhétorique de l'image (1980)
- Traité du signe visuel: Pour une rhétorique de l'image (1992)
- Figuras, conocimiento, cultura. Ensayos retóricos (2003)
- Principia semiotica: aux sources du sens. (2015)

== See also ==
- Allotopy
