= Algirdas Julien Greimas =

Lithuanian-French linguist (1917–1992)

Algirdas Greimas
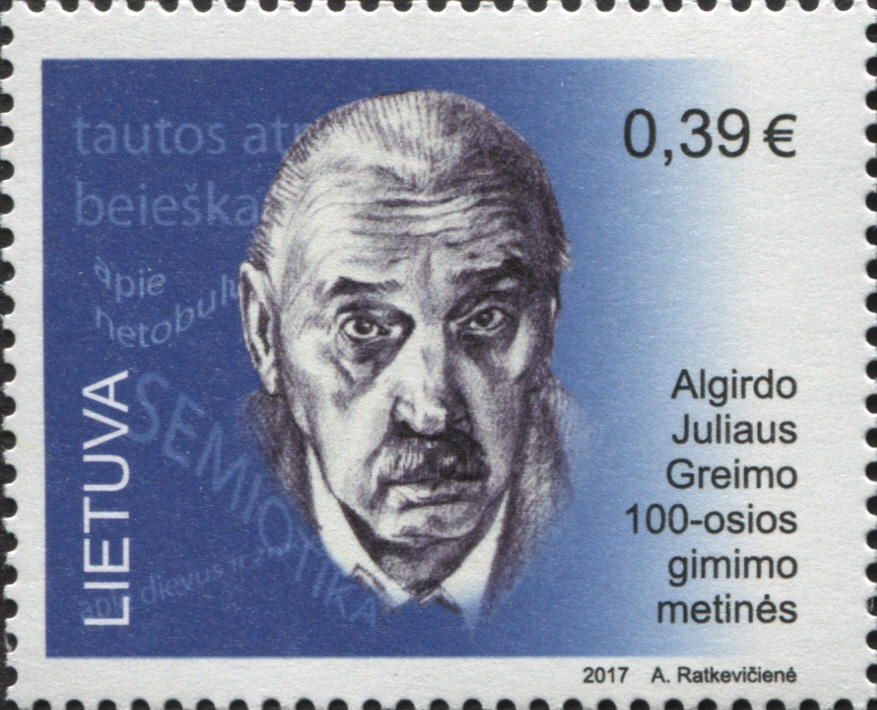
- Born: Algirdas Julius Greimas; 9 March 1917; Tula, Russian Empire
- Died: 27 February 1992 (aged 74); Paris, France
- Citizenship: Lithuania, France
- Education: Vytautas Magnus University; University of Grenoble; University of Paris (PhD, 1949)
- Known for: Greimas square, actantial model, isotopy
- Spouse: Teresa Mary Keane
- Scientific career
- Fields: Semiotics, structural linguistics
- Workplaces: École des Hautes Études en Sciences Sociales
- Doctoral advisor: Charles Bruneau
- Doctoral students: Jacques Fontanille

Algirdas Julien Greimas (French: [alɡiʁdas ʒyljɛ̃ gʁɛmas]; born Algirdas Julius Greimas; 9 March 1917 – 27 February 1992) was a Lithuanian literary scientist who wrote most of his body of work in French while living in France. Greimas is known among other things for the Greimas square (le carré sémiotique). He is, along with Roland Barthes, considered the most prominent of the French semioticians. With his training in structural linguistics, he added to the theory of signification, plastic semiotics, and laid the foundations for the Paris school of semiotics. Among Greimas's major contributions to semiotics are the concepts of isotopy, the actantial model, the narrative program, and the semiotics of the natural world. He also researched Lithuanian mythology and Proto-Indo-European religion, and was influential in semiotic literary criticism.

== Biography ==
Greimas's father, Julius Greimas, 1882–1942, a teacher and later school inspector, was from Liudvinavas in the Suvalkija region of present-day Lithuania. His mother, Konstancija Greimienė, née Mickevičiūtė (Mickevičius), 1886–1956, a secretary, was from Kalvarija. They lived in Tula, Russia, when he was born, where they ran away as refugees during World War I. They returned with him to Lithuania when he was two years old. His baptismal names are Algirdas Julius but he used the French version of his middle name, Julien, while he lived abroad. He did not speak any language other than Lithuanian until preparatory middle school, where he started with German and then French, which opened the door for his early philosophical readings in high school of Friedrich Nietzsche and Arthur Schopenhauer. After attending schools in several towns, as his family moved, and finishing Rygiškių Jonas High School in Marijampolė in 1934, he studied law at Vytautas Magnus University, Kaunas, and then drifted toward linguistics at the University of Grenoble, from which he graduated in 1939 with a paper on Franco-Provençal dialects. He hoped to focus next on early medieval linguistics (substrate toponyms in the Alps). However, in July 1939, with war looming, the Lithuanian government drafted him into a military academy.

The Soviet ultimatum led to a new "people's government" in Soviet-occupied Lithuania which Greimas was sympathetic to. In July 1940, he gave speeches urging Lithuanians to elect leaders who would vote in favor of annexation by the Soviet Union. As his friend Aleksys Churginas advised, in every speech he would mention Stalin and end by clapping for himself. In October, he was discharged into the reserve, and he began teaching French, German, Lithuanian, and humanities at schools in Šiauliai. He fell in love with socialist Hania (Ona) Lukauskaitė, who later became an anti-Soviet conspirator with Jonas Noreika, served ten years in a lager in Vorkuta, and was a founder of the Lithuanian Helsinki Group of anti-Soviet dissidents. Greimas became an avid reader of Marx. In March 1941, Greimas's friend, Vladas Pauža, a boy scout and fellow teacher, enlisted him in the Lithuanian Activist Front. This underground network was preparing for a Nazi German invasion as the opportunity to restore Lithuania's independence. On 14 June 1941, the Soviets detained his parents, arresting his father and sending him to Krasnoyarsk Krai, where he died in 1942. His mother was deported to Altai Krai. Meanwhile, during these traumatic deportations, Greimas had been mobilized as an army officer to write up the property of detained Lithuanians. Greimas became an anti-Communist but retained a lifelong affinity with Marxist, leftist, and liberal ideas.

Nazi Germany's invading forces entered Šiauliai on 26 June 1941. The next day, Greimas met with other partisans and was put in charge of a platoon. He handed down an order from the German Commandant to round up 100 Jews to sweep the streets. He felt uncomfortable and did not return the next day. Nevertheless, he became an editor of the weekly Tėvynė, which urged ethnic cleansing of Jews from Lithuania. The nominal editor, Vladas Pauža, was a proponent of genocide. In 1942, in Kaunas, Greimas became active in the underground Lithuanian Freedom Fighters Union, which derived from the Lithuanian Nationalist Party, which the Nazis had banned in December 1941. He grew close to life long liberal-minded friends Bronys Raila, Stasys Žakevičius-Žymantas, and Jurgis Valiulis.

In 1944, he enrolled for graduate study at the Sorbonne in Paris and specialized in lexicography, namely taxonomies of exact, interrelated definitions. He wrote a thesis on the vocabulary of fashion (a topic later popularized by Roland Barthes), for which he received a PhD in 1949.

Greimas began his academic career as a teacher at a French Catholic boarding school for girls in Alexandria in Egypt, where he would take part in a weekly discussion group of about a dozen European researchers that included a philosopher, a historian, and a sociologist. Early on, he also met Roland Barthes, with whom he remained close for the next 15 years. In 1959, he moved on to universities in Ankara and Istanbul in Turkey, and then to Poitiers in France. In 1965, he became professor at the École des Hautes Études en Sciences Sociales (EHESS) in Paris, where he taught for almost 25 years. He co-founded and became Secretary General of the International Association for Semiotic Studies.

Greimas died in 1992 in Paris, and was buried at his mother's resting place, Petrašiūnai Cemetery in Kaunas, Lithuania. (His parents were deported to Siberia during the Soviet occupation. His mother managed to return in 1954; his father perished and his grave is unknown, but he has a symbolic tombstone at the cemetery.) He was survived by his wife, Teresa Mary Keane.

== Work ==
=== Early ===
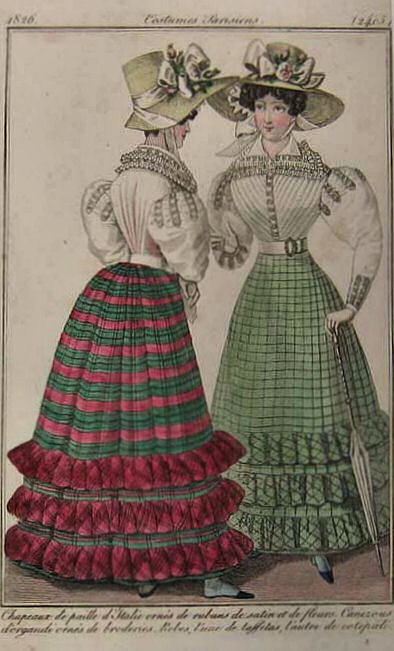
Greimas's thesis was on old Parisian fashion words.

Greimas's first published essay Cervantes ir jo don Kichotas ("Cervantes and his Don Quixote") came out in the literary journal Varpai, which he helped to found, during the period of alternating Nazi and Soviet occupations of Lithuania. Although a review of the first Lithuanian translation of Don Quixote, it addressed partly the issue of one's resistance to circumstances – even when doomed, defiance can at least aim at the preservation of one's dignity (Nebijokime būti donkichotai 'Let's not be afraid to be Don Quixotes'). The first work of direct significance to his subsequent research was his doctoral thesis La Mode en 1830. Essai de description du vocabulaire vestimentaire d' après les journaux de modes [sic] de l'époque 'Fashion in 1830. A Study of the Vocabulary of Clothes based on the Fashion Magazines of the Times'. He left lexicology soon after, acknowledging the limitations of the discipline in its concentration on the word as a unit and in its basic aim of classification, but he never ceased to maintain his lexicological convictions. He published three dictionaries throughout his career. During his decade in Alexandria, the discussions in his circle of friends helped broaden his interests. The topics included Greimas's early influences – the works of the founder of structural linguistics Ferdinand de Saussure and his follower, Danish linguist Louis Hjelmslev, the initiator of comparative mythology Georges Dumézil, the structural anthropologist Claude Lévi-Strauss, the Russian specialist in fairy tales Vladimir Propp, the researcher into the aesthetics of theater Étienne Souriau, the phenomenologists Edmund Husserl and Maurice Merleau-Ponty, the psychoanalyst Gaston Bachelard, and the novelist and art historian André Malraux.

=== Discourse semiotics ===
Semiotic square

Greimas proposed an original method for discourse semiotics that evolved over a thirty-year period. His starting point began with a profound dissatisfaction with the structural linguistics of the mid-century that studied only phonemes (minimal sound units of every language) and morphemes (grammatical units that occur in the combination of phonemes). These grammatical units could generate an infinite number of sentences, the sentence remaining the largest unit of analysis. Such a molecular model did not permit the analysis of units beyond the sentence.

Greimas begins by positing the existence of a semantic universe that he defined as the sum of all possible meanings that can be produced by the value systems of the entire culture of an ethno-linguistic community. As the semantic universe cannot possibly be conceived of in its entirety, Greimas was led to introduce the notion of semantic micro-universe and discourse universe, as actualized in written, spoken or iconic texts. To come to grips with the problem of signification or the production of meaning, Greimas had to transpose one level of language (the text) into another level of language (the metalanguage) and work out adequate techniques of transposition.

The descriptive procedures of narratology and the notion of narrativity are at the very base of Greimassian semiotics of discourse. His initial hypothesis is that meaning is only apprehensible if it is articulated or narrativized. Second, for him, narrative structures can be perceived in other systems not necessarily dependent upon natural languages. This leads him to posit the existence of two levels of analysis and representation: a surface and a deep level, which forms a common trunk where narrativity is situated and organized anterior to its manifestation. The signification of a phenomenon does not therefore depend on the mode of its manifestation, but since it originates at the deep level, it cuts through all forms of linguistic and non-linguistic manifestation. Greimas' semiotics, which is generative and transformational, goes through three phases of development. He begins by working out a semiotics of action (sémiotique de l'action), where subjects are defined in terms of their quest for objects, following a canonical narrative schema, which is a formal framework made up of three successive sequences: a mandate, an action and an evaluation. He then constructs a narrative grammar and works out a syntax of narrative programs in which subjects are joined up with or separated from objects of value. In the second phase, he works out a cognitive semiotics (sémiotique cognitive), where in order to perform, subjects must be competent to do so. The subjects' competence is organized by means of a modal grammar that accounts for their existence and performance. This modal semiotics opens the way to the final phase that studies how passions modify actional and cognitive performance of subjects (sémiotique de passions), and how belief and knowledge modify the competence and performance of these very same subjects.

=== Mythology ===
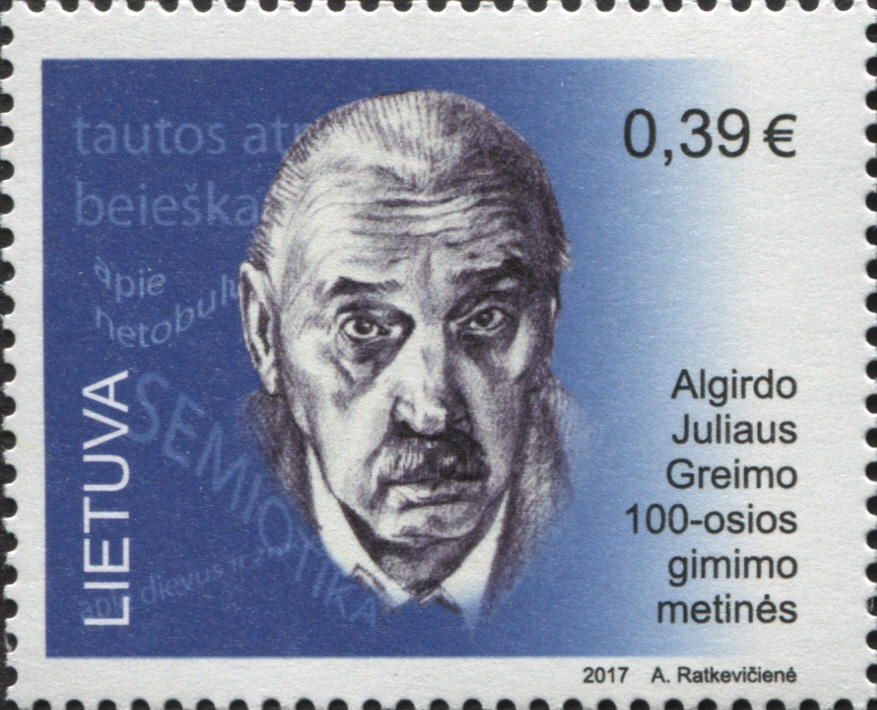
Algirdas Julien Greimas on a 2017 stamp of Lithuania

He later began researching and reconstructing Lithuanian mythology. He based his work on the methods of Vladimir Propp, Georges Dumézil, Claude Lévi-Strauss, and Marcel Detienne. He published the results in Apie dievus ir žmones: lietuvių mitologijos studijos (Of Gods and Men: Studies in Lithuanian Mythology) 1979, and Tautos atminties beieškant (In Search of National Memory) 1990. He also wrote on Proto-Indo-European religion.

== Works translated in English ==
- —— (1983) [1966]. Structural Semantics: An Attempt at a Method. Translated by McDowell, Daniele; Schleifer, Ronald; Velie, Alan. Lincoln: University of Nebraska Press. ISBN 9780803221123.
- —— (1987) [1970]. On meaning : selected writings in semiotic theory. Theory and history of literature. Vol. 38. Translated by Collins, Frank; Perron, Paul. Minneapolis: University of Minnesota Press. ISBN 9780816615186.
- —— (1988) [1976]. Maupassant: The Semiotics of Text. Translated by Perron, Paul. Amsterdam: J. Benjamins. ISBN 9781556190391.
- —— (1989) [1976]. The Social Sciences. A Semiotic View. Translated by Collins, Frank; Perron, Paul. Minneapolis: University of Minnesota Press. ISBN 9780816618187.
- ——; Courtés, Joseph (1982) [1979]. Semiotics and Language: An Analytical Dictionary. Translated by Crist, Larry; Patte, Daniel; Lee, James; McMahon, Edward II; Phillips, Gary; Rengstorf, Michael. Bloomington: Indiana University Press. ISBN 9780253351692.
- —— (1992) [1985]. Of Gods and Men: Studies in Lithuanian Mythology. Translated by Newman, Milda. Bloomington: Indiana University Press. ISBN 9780253326522.
- ——; Fontanille, Jacques (1993) [1991]. The Semiotics of Passions: From States of Affairs to States of Feelings. Translated by Perron, Paul; Collins, Frank. Minneapolis: University of Minnesota Press. ISBN 9780816621040.
