= Jacques Fontanille =

French semiotician

Jacques Fontanille (born 1948) is a French semiotician. He has authored or co-authored ten books and a number of articles or book chapters whose topics span theoretical semiotics, literary semiotics, and semiotics of the visual.

== Career ==
A former student and collaborator of the founder of the Paris School of Semiotics, Algirdas Julien Greimas, Fontanille is one of the main continuators of Greimas' research program as he collaborated with him in his last published works, and assisted him in the administering and organizing of the Inter-Semiotic seminar at the École des Hautes Études en Sciences Sociales (EHESS) in Paris. After Greimas' death, the course continued under Fontanille's mantle until it became his own seminar at the Institut Universitaire de France.

Fontanille is former Président (2005–2019) at the Université de Limoges in France, where he teaches courses in Linguistics, Semiotics, Stylistics, and Rhetoric. He is a Senior Member of the Institut Universitaire de France. With Greimas, Fontanille elaborated a semiotics of the passions. With Claude Zilberberg, he developed a tensive semiotics. His most recent books include Sémiotique du discours (2003) translated into English as The Semiotics of Discourse in the Berkeley Insights in Linguistics and Semiotics Series (2006), and Soma et séma (2004).
