= Seme (semantics) =

Smallest unit of meaning

Seme, the smallest unit of meaning recognized in semantics, refers to a single characteristic of a sememe. These characteristics are defined according to the differences between sememes. The term was introduced by Eric Buyssens in the 1930s and developed by Bernard Pottier in the 1960s. It is the result produced when determining the minimal elements of meaning, which enables one to describe words multilingually. Such elements provide a bridge to componential analysis and the initial work of ontologies.

== See also ==
- Asemic writing
- Meme
- Phoneme
- Memetics
- Mimicry
