= Umberto Eco bibliography =

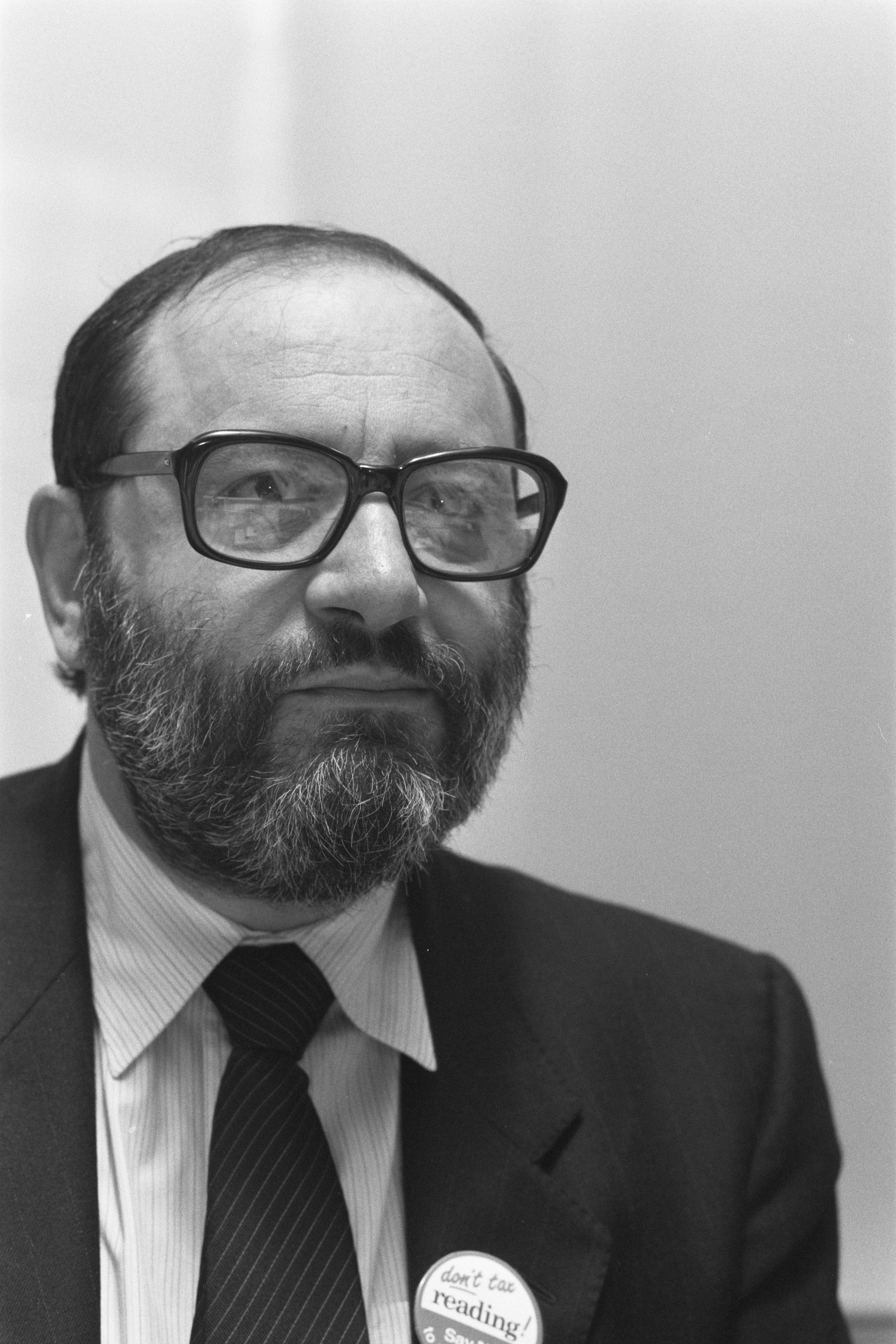
Eco in 1987

This is a list of works published by Umberto Eco.

== Novels ==
- Il nome della rosa (1980; English translation: The Name of the Rose, 1983)
- Il pendolo di Foucault (1988; English translation: Foucault's Pendulum, 1989)
- L'isola del giorno prima (1994; English translation: The Island of the Day Before, 1995)
- Baudolino (2000; English translation: Baudolino, 2001)
- La misteriosa fiamma della regina Loana (2004; English translation: The Mysterious Flame of Queen Loana, 2005)
- Il cimitero di Praga (2010; English translation: The Prague Cemetery, 2011)
- Numero Zero (2015; English translation: Numero Zero, 2015)

== Children's books ==
- La bomba e il generale (1966, Rev. 1988 - English translation: The Bomb and the General, 1989), illustrated by Eugenio Carmi, ISBN 978-0-15-209700-4
- I tre cosmonauti (1966 - English translation: The Three Astronauts, or The Three Cosmonauts, 1989), illustrated by Eugenio Carmi, ISBN 978-0-436-14094-5
- Ammazza l'uccellino (1973), pseudonym Dedalus, illustrated by Monica Sangberg
- Gli gnomi di Gnu (1992 - English translation: The Gnomes of Gnu, 1992), illustrated by Eugenio Carmi, ISBN 978-88-452-1885-9
- I promessi sposi (2010)

== Non-fiction ==
=== Essays ===
Collections:

- Diario minimo (1963 – English translation: Misreadings, 1993), collection of 16 essays (6 added in 1975):
  "Nonita", "Frammenti", "Lo streap-tease e la cavallinità", "Fenomenologia di Mike Bongiorno", "Esquisse d'un nouveau chat", "L'altro Empireo", "La Cosa", "My Examination Round his Factification for Incamination to Reduplication with Ridecolation of a Portrait of the Artist as Manzoni", "Industria e repressione sessuale in una società padana", "Elogio di Franti", "Dove andremo a finire?" (added in 1975), "Lettera a mio figlio" (added in 1975), "Tre recensioni anomale" (added in 1975), "La scoperta dell'America" (added in 1975), "Do your movie yourself" (added in 1975), "Dolenti declinare (rapporti di lettura all'editore)" (added in 1975)
- La struttura assente, or La struttura assente: Introduzione alla ricerca semiologica (1968 – The Absent Structure), collection of 7 essays:
  "Il segnale e il senso", "Le comunicazioni visive", "Semiologia dell'architettura", "Le articolazioni del codice cinematografico", "Retorica della pubblicità", "Critica dello strutturalismo ontologico", "Le frontiere della semiologia"
- The Role of the Reader: Explorations in the Semiotics of Texts (1979 – English edition containing essays from Opera aperta, Apocalittici e integrati, Forme del contenuto, Il Superuomo di massa and Lector in Fabula)
- Sugli specchi e altri saggi (1985), collection of 24 essays:
  "Modi di rappresentazione": "Sugli specchi", "Il segno teatrale", "Il linguaggio del volto", "L'illusione realistica", "Il Milione: descrivere l'ignoto", "Le tentazioni della scrittura", "Della cattiva pittura", "Dieci modi di sognare il medioevo"
  "Tra esperimento e consumo": "Il Gruppo 63, lo sperimentalismo e l'avanguardia", "Il testo, il piacere, il consumo", "Il tempo dell'arte", "L'innovazione nel seriale", "Elogio del Montecristo"
  "Congetture su mondi": "L'abduzione in Uqbar", "I mondi della fantascienza", "Ritratto di Plinio da giovane", "La combinatoria dei possibili e l'incombenza della morte"
  "Tra poesia e prosa": "L'epistola XIII, l'allegorismo medievale, il simbolismo moderno", "Il segno della poesia e il segno della prosa", "Pirandello ridens", "Ma che cosa è questo campanile?"
  "Discorsi sulle scienze umane": "Huizinga e il gioco", "Segni, pesci e bottoni. Appunti su semiotica, filosofia e scienze umane", "L'Antiporfirio"
- Il secondo diario minimo (1992), collection of 72 essays:
  "I. Storie vere": "Intervista con Pietro Micca", "Stelle e stellette", "Una storia vera", "Concorsi a cattedra", "Quando entrai nella PP2", "Correzioni editoriali", "Conversazione a Babilonia", "Italia 2000", "Dell'esternazione"
  "II. Istruzioni per l'uso": "Come fare l'indiano", "Come presentare un catalogo d'arte", "Come organizzare una biblioteca pubblica", "Come fare le vacanze intelligenti", "Come sostituire una patente rubata", "Come seguire le istruzioni", "Come evitare malattie contagiose", "Come viaggiare con un salmone", "Come fare un inventario", "Come comperare gadgets", "Come diventare cavaliere di Malta", "Come mangiare in aereo", "Come parlare degli animali", "Come scrivere un'introduzione", "Come presentare in TV", "Come usare la cuccuma maledetta", "Come impiegare il tempo", "Come usare il tassista", "Come smentire una smentita", "Come cestinare i telegrammi", "Come inizia e come finisce", "Come non sapere l'ora", "Come passare la dogana", "Come non usare il fax", "Come reagire ai volti noti", "Come riconoscere un film porno", "Come mangiare il gelato", "Come non dire "esatto"", "Come guardarsi dalle vedove", "Come non parlare di calcio", "Come giustificare una biblioteca privata", "Come non usare il telefonino cellulare", "Come viaggiare sui treni americani", "Come scegliere un mestiere redditizio", "Come mettere i puntini di sospensione"
  "III. Frammenti dalla Cacopedia": "Dell'impossibilità di costruire la carta dell'impero 1 a 1", "Tre civette sul comò", "L'Anopticon", "The Wom", "Il pensiero di Brachamutanda", "Come falsificare Eraclito", "Il teorema degli ottocento colori", "Progetto per una facoltà d'irrilevanza comparata", "Lineamenti di critica quantistica", "Utrum deus sit"
  "IV. Filastrocche per adulti": "Filosofi in libertà", "Scrittori in libertà", "Edipo Re", "Un inedito di Dante su Saussure", "Alessandro Manzoni, La Gnosi", "Piccola metafisica portatile", "Chansons à boire per congressi scientifici"
  "V. Giochi di parole": "Undici nuove danze per Montale", "Iniziali", "Come va?", "Il libro mascherato", "Ircocervi", "Continuazioni", "Anagrammi", "Anagrammi a posteriori", "Dodici indovinelli", "Dialogo del Becero Muto con Boote"
  "VI. Il miracolo di San Baudolino"
- Cinque scritti morali (1997 – English translation: Five Moral Pieces, 2001), collection of 5 essays:
  "Pensare la guerra", "Il fascismo eterno", "Sulla stampa", "Quando entra in scena l'altro", "La religiosità etica"
- Kant e l'ornitorinco (1997 – English translation: Kant and the Platypus: Essays on Language and Cognition, 1999)
- Serendipities: Language and Lunacy (1998), collection of 5 essays:
  "The Force of Falsity", "Languages in Paradise", "From Marco Polo to Leibniz: Stories of Intellectual Misunderstandings", "The Language of the Austral Land", "The Linguistics of Joseph de Maistre"
- How to Travel with a Salmon & Other Essays (1998 – Partial English translation of Il secondo diario minimo, 1994)
- Tra menzogna e ironia (1998), collection of 4 essays:
  "Migrazioni di Cagliostro", "Il linguaggio mendace in Manzoni", "Campanile: Il comico come straniament", "Geografia imperfetta di corto maltese"
- La bustina di Minerva (1999)
- Sulla letteratura (2002 – English translation by Martin McLaughlin: On Literature, 2004), collection of 18 essays:
  "Su alcune funzioni della letteratura", "Lettura del Paradiso", "Sullo stile del Manifesto", "Le brume del Valois", "Wilde. Paradosso e aforisma", "A portrait of the artist as a bachelor", "Tra La Mancha e Babele", "Borges e la mia angoscia dell'influenza", "Su Camporesi: sangue corpo, vita", "Sul simbolo", "Sullo stile", "Les sémaphores sous la pluie", "Le sporcizie della forma", "Ironia intertestuale e livelli di lettura", "La Poetica e noi", "Il mito americano di tre generazioni antiamericane", "La forza del falso", "Come scrivo"
- Mouse or Rat?: Translation as negotiation (2003)
- A passo di gambero: Guerre calde e populismo mediatico (2006 – English translation: Turning Back the Clock: Hot Wars and Media Populism, 2007)
- La memoria vegetale e altri scritti di bibliofilia (2006), collection of 19 essays:
  "Sulla bibliofilia": "La memoria vegetale", "Riflessioni sulla bibliofilia", "Collazioni di un collezionista"
  "Historica": "Sul libro di Lindisfarne", "Sulle Très Riches Heures", "Sugli Isolari", "Perché Kircher?", "Il mio Migne, e l'altro", "Lo strano caso della Hanau 1609"
  "Folli letterari (e scientifici)": "Varia et curiosa", "Il capolavoro di uno sconosciuto"
  "Eterotopie e falsificazioni": "La peste dello straccio", "Prima dell'estinzione", "Monologo interiore di un e-book", "Shakespeare era per caso Shakespeare", "Per una riforma dei cataloghi", "Il codice Temesvar", "Asta di libri appartenuti a Ricardo Montenegro", "Il problema della soglia. Saggio di Para-antropologia"
- 11/9 La cospirazione impossibile (2007), with Piergiorgio Odifreddi, Michael Shermer, James Randi, Paolo Attivissimo, Lorenzo Montali, Francesco Grassi, Andrea Ferrero and Stefano Bagnasco
- Costruire il nemico e altri scritti occasionali (2011 – English translation by Richard Dixon: Inventing the Enemy, 2012), collection of 15 essays:
  "Costruire il nemico", "Assoluto e relativo", "La fiamma è bella", "Andare per tesori", "Delizie fermentate", "Gli embrioni fuori del Paradiso", "Il Gruppo 63, quarant'anni dopo", "Hugo, hélas! La poetica dell'eccesso", "Veline e silenzio", "Astronomie immaginarie", "Paese che vai, usanza che trovi", "Io sono Edmond Dantés!", "Ci mancava anche l'Ulisse...", "Perché l'isola non viene mai trovata", "Riflessioni su WikiLeaks"
- Sulla televisione: Scritti 1956-2015 (2018)
- La filosofia di Umberto Eco: Con la sua Autobiografia intellettuale (2021)
- Sull'arte. Scritti dal 1955 al 2016 (2022)

Uncollected essays:

- Il problema estetico in San Tommaso (1956; Il problema estetico in Tommaso d'Aquino, 1970 – English translation: The Aesthetics of Thomas Aquinas, 1988, revised)
- "Sviluppo dell'estetica medievale", in Momenti e problemi di storia dell'estetica (1959 – Art and Beauty in the Middle Ages, 1985)
- Shaker: Il libro dei cocktail (1961), with Roberto Leydi
- Opera aperta: Forma e indeterminazione nelle poetiche contemporanee (1962, rev. 1976 – English translation: The Open Work (1989)
- Apocalittici e integrati (1964 – Partial English translation: Apocalypse Postponed, 1994)
- Le poetiche di Joyce: Dalla "Summa" al "Finnegans Wake" (1965 – English translations: The Middle Ages of James Joyce, The Aesthetics of Chaosmos, 1989)
- La definizione dell'arte (1968)
- Le forme del contenuto (1971)
- Documenti su il nuovo Medioevo (1972), with Francesco Alberoni, Furio Colombo and Giuseppe Sacco
- Il segno (1973)
- Il costume di casa: Evidenze e misteri dell'ideologia italiana (1973 – English translation: Faith in Fakes: Travels in Hyperreality, 1986)
- Beato di Liébana: Miniature del Beato de Fernando I y Sancha. Codice B.N. Madrid Vit. 14-2 (1973)
- Eugenio Carmi: Una pittura di paesaggio? (1973)
- Trattato di semiotica generale (1975 – English translation: A Theory of Semiotics, 1976)
- Il superuomo di massa: Studi sul romanzo popolare (1976)
- Stelle & stellette: La via lattea mormorò (1976), illustrated by Philippe Druillet
- Storia di una rivoluzione mai esistita: L'esperimento Vaduz. Appunti del Servizio opinioni, n.292, settembre 1976 (1976)
- Dalla periferia dell'impero (1977)
- Come si fa una tesi di laurea (1977 - English translation: How to Write a Thesis, 2015)
- Carolina Invernizio, Matilde Serao, Liala (1979), with others
- Lector in fabula, or Lector in fabula: La cooperazione interpretativa nei testi narrativi (1979)
- "Function and sign: The semiotics of architecture", in Signs, symbols and architecture (1980)
- De bibliotheca (1981 – in Italian and French)
- Postille a il nome della rosa (1983 – US edition: Postscript to The Name of the Rose, 1984; UK edition: Reflections on The Name of the Rose, 1985)
- Sette anni di desiderio: Cronache, 1977-1983 (1983)
- La riscoperta dell'America (1984), with Gian Paolo Ceserani and Beniamino Placido
- Semiotica e filosofia del linguaggio (1984 – English translation: Semiotics and the Philosophy of Language, 1984)
- Conceito de texto (1984)
- Arte e bellezza nell'estetica medievale (1987)
- Streit der Interpretationen (1987)
- "Notes sur la sémiotique de la réception", in Actes sémiotiques. Documents, IX, 81 (1987)
- Lo strano caso della Hanau 1609 (1989 – French translation: L'Enigme de l'Hanau 1609, 1990)
- Essay in Leggere i Promessi sposi. Analisi semiotiche (1989)
- I limiti dell'interpretazione (1990 – The Limits of Interpretation, 1990)
- Vocali, in Soluzioni felici (1991)
- La memoria vegetale (1992)
- La ricerca della lingua perfetta nella cultura europea (1993 – English translation: The Search for the Perfect Language (the Making of Europe), 1995)
- Six Walks in the Fictional Woods (1994)
- Interpretazione e sovrainterpretazione (1995 – English translation: Interpretation and Overinterpretation), with R. Rorty, J. Culler, C. Brooke-Rose; edited by S. Collini
- Incontro – Encounter – Rencontre (1996 – in Italian, English, French)
- In cosa crede chi non crede? (with Carlo Maria Martini), 1996 – English translation: Belief or Nonbelief?: A Dialogue, 2000)
- Neue Streichholzbriefe (1997)
- Talking of Joyce (1998)
- Gesammelte Streichholzbriefe (1998)
- Experiences in Translation (2000, University of Toronto Press)
- Guerre sante, passione e ragione: Pensieri sparsi sulla superiorità culturale. Scenari di una guerra globale, in Islam e Occidente. Riflessioni per la convivenza (2002)
- Dire quasi la stessa cosa: Esperienze di traduzione (2003)
- Il linguaggio della Terra Australe (2004)
- Il codice Temesvar (2005)
- Nel segno della parola (2005), with Daniele Del Giudice and Gianfranco Ravasi
- Sator Arepo eccetera (2006)
- Dall'albero al labirinto: Studi storici sul segno e l'interpretazione (2007 – English translation: "From the Tree to the Labyrinth: Historical Studies on the Sign and Interpretation", 2014, Anthony Oldcorn)
- Non sperate di liberarvi dei libri (2009), with Jean-Claude Carrière
- Vertigine della Lista (2009 – English translation: The Infinity of Lists)
- Confessions of a Young Novelist (2011)
- Scritti sul pensiero medievale (2012)
- Storia delle terre e dei luoghi leggendari (2013 – English translation by Alastair McEwen: The Book of Legendary Lands, 2013)
- Da dove si comincia? (2013), with Stefano Bartezzaghi
- Riflessioni sul dolore (2014)
- Come viaggiare con un salmone (2016)
- Sulle spalle dei giganti (2017– English translation by Alastair McEwen: On the Shoulders of Giants, 2019)

=== Articles ===
- Pape Satàn Aleppe: Cronache di una società liquida (2016 – English translation by Richard Dixon: Chronicles of a Liquid Society, 2017), collection of journalistic columns

== Anthologies ==
- Eco, Umberto; Sebeok, Thomas A., eds. (1984), The Sign of Three: Dupin, Holmes, Peirce, Bloomington, IN: History Workshop, Indiana University Press, ISBN 978-0-253-35235-4, 236 pages. Ten essays on methods of abductive inference in Poe's Dupin, Doyle's Holmes, Peirce and many others.
- Eco, Umberto; Marmo, Constantino, eds. (1989), On the Medieval Theory of Signs, Amsterdam: Benjamins, ISBN 978-9027232939, 236 pages. Two essay by U. Eco, medieval texts and commentaries.
