= Elena Kostioukovitch =

Ukrainian-Italian writer and translator (born 1958)

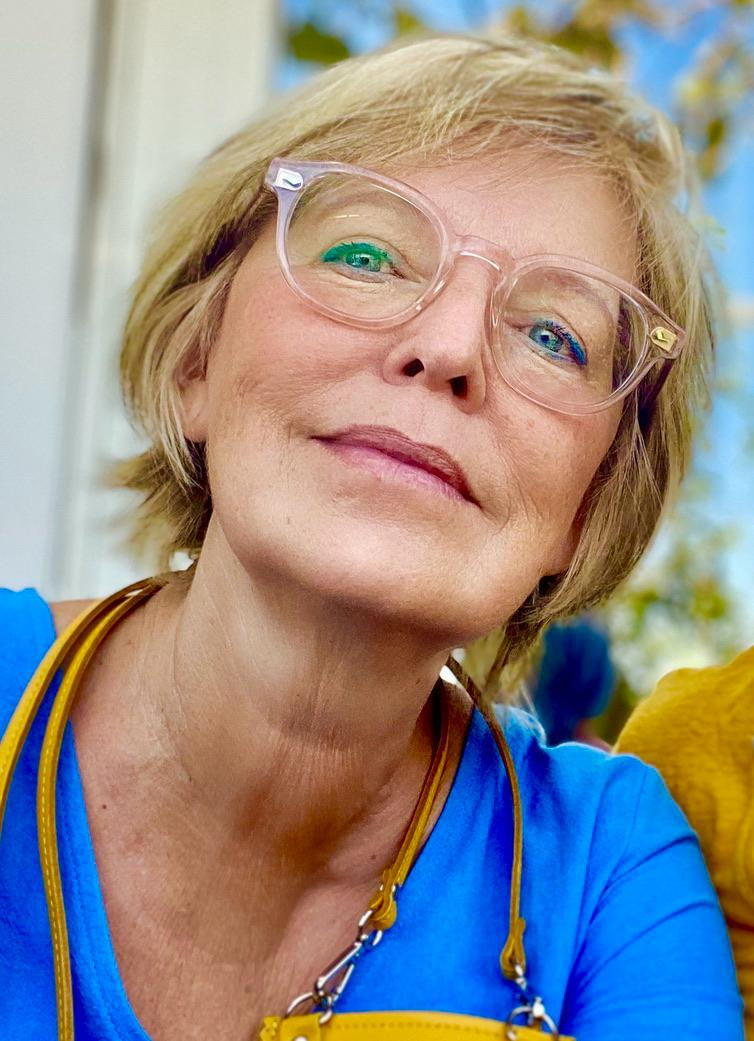
- Born: 1958 (age 67–68); Kyiv, Ukraine
- Occupations: translator, writer
- Website: elkost.it

Elena Kostioukovitch (born 1958) is a Ukrainian-Italian essayist, novelist and literary translator, with Ukrainian and Russian-Jewish origins, based in Milan, Italy.

== Biography ==
Kostioukovitch's interest in literature dates back to her childhood years, influenced by her grandfather, Russian writer and painter Leonid Volynski (Seven Days, Moscow 1956). Growing up in Kyiv and later in Moscow, she had access to artistic and literary figures, particularly Soviet dissidents Viktor Nekrasov and Alexander Galich.

At the age of 17, Kostioukovitch entered the M.V. Lomonosov Moscow State University, where she graduated with honors in 1980 with a thesis on L’Adone by Giambattista Marino. She later completed a Ph.D. on Italian Baroque Aesthetics. Between 1980 and 1988 she was head of the Italian department for the magazine Contemporary Foreign Fiction.

After moving to Italy in 1988, Kostioukovich worked as editor of a Russian series for publishers such as Bompiani (RCS MediaGroup), Sperling&Kupfer and Frassinelli (Mondadori Group)(1996–2008). She also promoted Russian culture in Italy and Italian culture in Russia at various festivals and events, including the Mantua Book Festival, Cultural Days in Auditorium (Rome), Prima Vista Festival (Tartu, Estonia), the Science Festival Genoa, the Montpellier Literary Festival, the Babel Festival Bellinzona, the Non Fiction Book Fair in Moscow, the Turin International Book Fair and the Frankfurt Book Fair.

She is a member of the scientific committee of the Italian branch of Memorial, an association awarded the Nobel Peace Prize in 2022.

== Academic career ==
Between 1989 and 2015, Kostioukovitch taught at several Italian universities, including the University of Trento, the School for Interpreters and Translators in Trieste and the University of Milan, where she lectured on Russian literature and culture. She also curated various anthologies of Russian literature, contributing significantly to the introduction of Russian authors to Italian audiences.

== Translations ==
Her work as a scholar of Italian literature resulted in her translation of numerous books, including: Orlando Furioso by Ludovico Ariosto, Through the Lens of Aristotle by Emanuele Tesauro, and Scherzi by Giuseppe Giusti. She annotated the Russian Edition of "The Betrothed" by Alessandro Manzoni. She has also translated a number of modern Italian poets, including Amelia Rosselli, Valerio Magrelli, Pier Paolo Pasolini, Roberto Roversi, Rocco Scotellaro, Salvatore Quasimodo, and Vittorio Sereni. Her translations were included in the "Verses of the Century" anthology (Moscow, 1998).

In 1988, her Russian translation of Umberto Eco’s The Name of the Rose made her famous overnight. Ever since its first publication the book has never been out of print. Following this success, she became Eco's official Russian translator, working on his subsequent works, including 8 non-fiction books and the novels (Foucault's Pendulum, The Island of the Day Before, Baudolino, The Mysterious Flame of Queen Loana, The Prague Cemetery and Numero Zero. She also edited Umberto Eco's entire series on the history of art (On Beauty, On Ugliness, The Infinity of Lists, The Book of Legendary Lands, On the Shoulders of Giants, etc.).

== Essays and Novels ==
In 2006, Kostioukovitch published Why Italians Love to Talk About Food, an exploration of Italian culinary traditions that dives into the sociocultural importance of food in Italy. This book became a bestseller and was translated into 18 languages.

In 2013, Kostioukovitch's first novel Zwinger was released in Russia by Corpus Books and in 2022 in Ukraine by Folio. The novel combines elements of historical fiction and thriller, presented with a lively and ironic style. Set against the backdrop of a fictional detective story during the 2005 Frankfurt Book Fair, it delves into real mysteries of 20th-century history, drawing from precious documents belonging to the author's grandfather, Leonid Volynski. Volynski, a World War II "Monuments Men," led the Red Army's investigation unit tasked with recovering paintings from the Dresden Art Museum, hidden by the Nazis.

In 2022, she published Nella mente di Vladimir Putin, an analysis of the Russian ideology that led to the war in Ukraine. The book has since been translated into German, Hungarian, Latvian, and Polish.

In 2025, she published Kyiv. Una fortezza sopra l'abisso (Kyiv. A Fortress Over th Abyss) with La Nave di Teseo. Through a multifaceted lens that intertwines history, literature, culture, and personal memories, the book traces Kyiv’s turbulent history, from the Mongol invasions to the devastation of the Russian Revolution, and the ongoing Russian-Ukrainian war.

In 2026, again with La Nave di Teseo, she published Tradurre Umberto Eco mentre scoppiano le rivoluzioni (Translating Umberto Eco As Revolutions Break Out), a book the publisher describes as “at once a collective autobiography, an essay on translation, a journey into Umberto Eco’s creative world, and a reflection on the cultural and political transformations of recent decades.”

== Awards ==
Kostioukovitch has received numerous literary awards, including Best Translation of the Year in the USSR (1988), the Zoil Award (1999), the Grinzane Cavour Moscow Prize (2004), the Welcome Prize (2005) from the Russian National Association of Restaurateurs, the Bancarella Cucina Award (2007, Italy), the Chiavari Literary Prize (2007, Italy), the National Prize for Translation from the Italian Ministry of Culture (2007), the "For the Rapprochement of Cultures" Prize awarded at the Turin Book Fair (2011), and the Gogol Prize (2012).

== ELKOST Literary Agency ==
Kostioukovitch has introduced many new Russian authors to both the Italian and international reading communities. In 2000, she founded the Elkost Literary Agency, which handles world publishing rights for prominent Russian authors such as Lyudmila Ulitskaya, Sasha Sokolov, Boris Akunin, Elena Rzhevskaya, Andrey Volos, Dina Rubina, Aleksandr Kabakov, Vladimir Kantor, Marina Vishnevetskaya, and Leonid Yuzefovitch, as well as bestselling children's author Grigory Oster and others.

Notably, in 2009, Kostioukovitch edited the Italian translation of Eufrosinia Kersnovskaya's account of life in the Stalinist Gulag. Her tragic story, enhanced by her own illustrations, unfolds like an illustrated novel — the only visual record of the Gulags, as no documentary footage exists of this dark chapter of human history.

The agency also manages world publishing rights for the literary estates of Juri Lotman, Ilya Ehrenburg, Ilya Mitrofanov, and the archival findings of the Memorial Society.
