= Djebbar =

Djebbar is a surname. Notable people with the surname include:

- Ahmed Djebbar (born 1941), Algerian academic and politician
