= Kant and the Platypus =

1997 book by Umberto Eco

First edition (publ. Bompiani)

Kant and the Platypus: Essays on Language and Cognition (ISBN 0-15-601159-X) is a book by Umberto Eco which was published in Italian as Kant e l'ornitorinco in 1997. An English edition, translated by Alastair McEwen, appeared in 1999.

The book develops some aspects of Eco's A Theory of Semiotics which came out in 1976.

In the first chapter Eco argues against Nietzsche's assertion that the truth is a poetically elaborated "mobile army of metaphors, metonymies and anthropomorphisms" that subsequently get into knowledge, "illusions whose illusory nature has been forgotten".

In chapter two, working with ideas derived from Charles Sanders Peirce and Immanuel Kant, Eco compares linguistic and perceptual meaning when confronted with the unencountered.

Chapter three explores the Aztec encounter with the horse in terms of Cognitive Type, the private mechanism that allows identification of an object, and of Nuclear Content, which clarifies the relevant features inter-subjectively. To this is added Molar Content, which provides a much broader range of knowledge, even if restricted to specific competences. From these he develops an understanding of social elements in the organisation of knowledge.

In chapter four he discusses the different ordering of knowledge with a dictionary and an encyclopedia - that is, the differences between categorical knowledge and knowledge by properties. Using the example of the arrival of the first platypus in Europe, Eco looks at the problem faced by scientists in their attempts to classify the creature for eighty years, and at the contractual nature of the negotiations that produce shared meaning.

In chapter five Eco discusses the Sarkiiapone, an animal whose sole nature is that it is fictive. He then discusses how the meaning of a term is affected by the context, using examples to tease out different meanings.

Chapter six deals with iconism and hypoicon. Eco compares and contrasts "likeness" and "similarity" in relation to perception and conception. To this end he addresses basic semiotic processes that take place within perception and provide determinations from which cognitive types can be constructed, with all the cultural baggage that is involved.

== See also ==
- Schema (Kant) Footnote in Section 3.1.3.5
