= Emanuele Tesauro =

Italian philosopher (1592–1675)

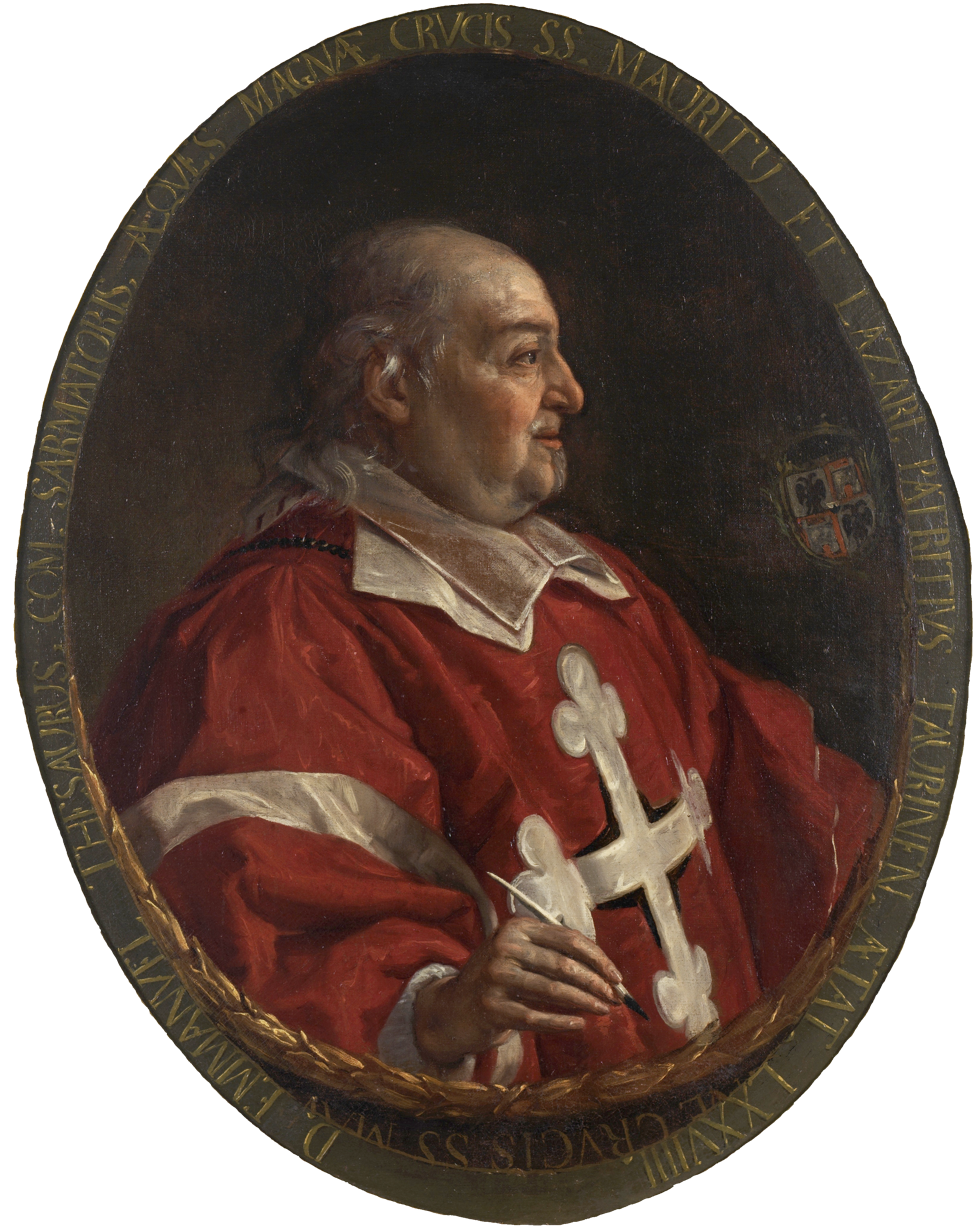
- Portrait of Emanuele Tesauro by Charles Dauphin (1670)
- Born: January 28, 1592; Turin, Duchy of Savoy
- Died: February 26, 1675 (aged 83); Turin, Duchy of Savoy
- Occupations: Rhetorician; Dramatist; Poet; Historian; Literary critic

Education
- Education: Jesuit Brera College (Milan); Collegium Maximum (Naples) (D.D., 1628)

Philosophical work
- Era: 17th-century philosophy
- Region: Western philosophy; Italian philosophy
- School: Christian philosophy; Aristotelianism; Baroque
- Notable students: Francesco Fulvio Frugoni
- Main interests: Aesthetics, poetics, historiography, literary theory, ethics, poetry, rhetoric
- Notable works: Il cannocchiale aristotelico; La filosofia morale

Ecclesiastical career
- Religion: Christianity
- Church: Catholic Church
- Ordained: October 1627

Emanuele Tesauro COSML (Italian: [emanuˈɛːle teˈzauro]; 28 January 1592 – 26 February 1675) was an Italian philosopher, rhetorician, literary theorist, dramatist, Marinist poet, and historian.

Tesauro is remembered chiefly for his seminal work Il cannocchiale aristotelico (The Aristotelian Telescope), the first and most important treatise on metaphor and conceit written in early modern Europe. Tesauro's Cannocchiale aristotelico has been called "one of the most important statements of poetics in seventeenth-century Europe", and "a milestone in the history of aesthetics". In Umberto Eco's The Island of the Day Before, Tesauro's theories are self-consciously taken up, through the character Padre Emanuele and his metaphor-machine.

== Biography ==
=== Early life and education ===
Emanuele Tesauro was born in Turin on January 28, 1592 into the noble family of the counts of Salmour. His father Alessandro was a noted diplomat, poet, and political figure, author of the didactic poem La sereide (1585). At the age of nineteen, Tesauro entered the Jesuit order. After earning his first degree, he taught rhetoric, first at the Brera college in Milan and then in Cremona.

During this time Tesauro wrote his first literary works: his epigrams, published posthumously, as well as his first play, the Hermengildus. In 1619 he published his highly influential Caesares, a collection of latin elegies and verses on Roman emperors from Julius Caesar to Domitian and various other poems, reprinted in Oxford in 1637, and again in London in 1651. He contributed eleven inscriptions to the celebrations which commemorated, at the behest of Pope Paul V, the beatification of Francis Xavier (Milan, 1620).

In 1622 Tesauro began his theological studies in Naples. The next year he moved to Milan to complete his studies. In 1624, while living in Milan, he was given permission to preach, and subsequently stayed in that city until 1630.

This is the period in which he produced the sacred panegyrics, including his most famous example, the Giudicio (1625), and the work entitled Idea delle perfette imprese, which remained unpublished until 1975. Subjects and objectives of this work would have been reabsorbed in the more extensive project of the influential Cannocchiale aristotelico.

=== At the Savoy court ===
In 1626 Tesauro moved to the Savoy court at Turin and became preacher to the duchess Cristina. He also carried out diplomatic missions between Lombardy and Piedmont. Tesauro was ordained as Jesuit priest in 1627 at the insistence of Cardinal Maurizio di Savoia. Due to political contrasts, he left the order in 1634, although he remained a secular priest. After leaving the order, Tesauro followed the duke's brother Thomas Francis, prince of Carignano as court historiographer during his Flemish campaign and the Piedmontese Civil War; in this period he wrote a history of the siege of Saint-Omer (Sant'Omero assediato) and Campeggiamenti, overo istorie del Piemonte, first published between 1640 and 1643.

In 1642 he returned to Turin, where he became Knight Grand Cross of the Order of Saints Maurice and Lazarus and preceptor of the princes of Carignano. He later tutored the future King of Sardinia Victor Amadeus II. In 1653 he resumed his preaching activity. In 1654 he published his masterpiece, the Cannocchiale aristotelico. Two years later he was commissioned by the municipality of Turin to write a history of the city. From 1669 to 1674 Tesauro oversaw the publication of the various volumes of his Complete Works, including his own revised version of the Cannocchiale (1670). He died in Turin in 1675. He was buried in the chapel of his noble family in the Church of S. Francesco in Fossano.

Tesauro was a very prolific author: he wrote tragedies, sacred poems, historical works, including Del Regno d'Italia sotto i Barbari (Of the Kingdom of Italy under the Barbarians, 1663–64), and philosophical works, such as La filosofia morale (1670), very widespread and appreciated. Tesauro's Filosofia morale saw twenty-seven editions over the course of the following century and translations in all of the major European languages, including French, German, Spanish, Greek, Russian and Armenian—as well as Latin (The Cambridge History of Seventeenth-Century Philosophy, 1282). In its Russian translation, it contributed Paul I's education.

== Il cannocchiale aristotelico ==
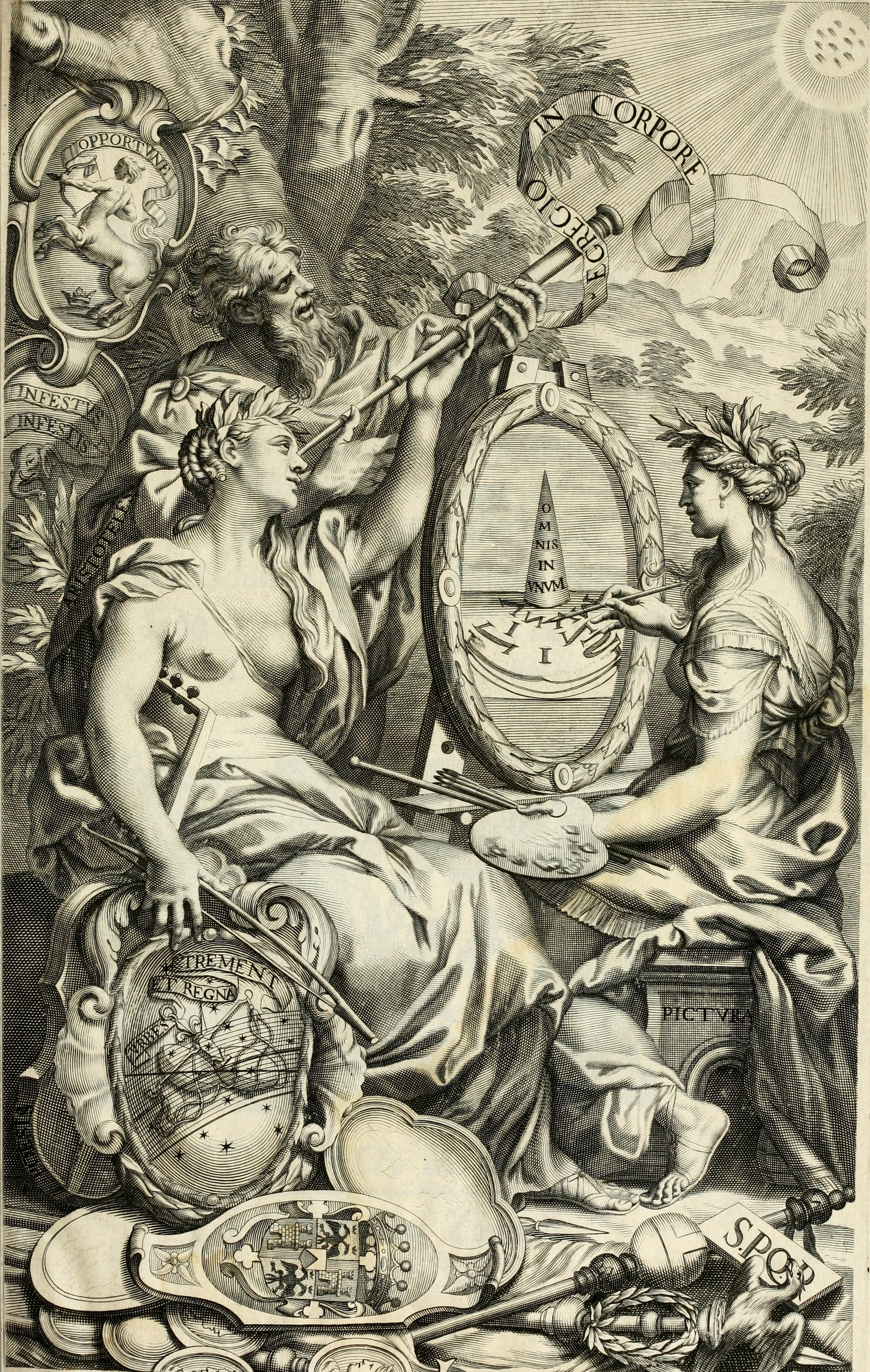
Frontispice of the 1670 edition of il Cannocchiale aristotelico

Tesauro's Cannocchiale aristotelico constituted, next to Baltasar Gracián's writings, the most ambitious and comprehensive theory of Baroque art. Tesauro formulated much of his Cannocchiale well before the date of publication, probably during the time he spent teaching rhetoric in Milan in the 1620s. Since the final revised version was completed only in 1670, the treatise is truly the product of a lifetime of reflection on poetics and rhetoric, spanning much of the Seicento.

Right from the title, Il cannocchiale aristotelico (The aristotelian telescope), Tesauro's work aims to revolutionize rhetoric and poetry in a way similar to what Galileo did in astronomy. The expression "aristotelian telescope" is an oxymoron: it brings together two opposing ideas: the telescope, "one of the most significant scientific inventions from the beginning of the seventeenth century," and Aristotle, the figure "in which modern science saw its greatest antagonist."

While having as a model the work of Aristotle, Tesauro tries for the first time to update the classical rhetoric to the new style of Baroque literature. He attempts to legitimise the Baroque "conceptist" style by arguing for its Aristotelian lineage. Tesauro calls on Aristotle for his own uses, one might say, making the philosopher say things that in truth he never said.

For Tesauro, as for Gracián in Spain, the most important faculty for any poet is wit (ingegno) which can be described as the capacity to create metaphors. Tesauro holds that, in opposition to intelletto (intellect), the faculty of seeking logical truth, ingegno is the faculty of "binding together the remote and separate notions of the proposed objects", and thus exactly corresponds to "the very function of metaphor", of "express[ing] one concept by means of another very different one," of "finding similarity in things dissimilar".

The chief instrument of wit, metaphor is capable of achieving, through analogy, the marvelous and the new. Tesauro defined metaphor as the "madre di tutte le argutezze" [mother of all wit], whose main aim is to generate "wonder in the reader", as well as to penetrate the variety of creation. Tesauro identifies three kinds of metaphor: the simple metaphor, the metaphysical proposition (or allegory), and the metaphysical argument. These correspond to the three operations of the intellect: apprehension, judgement, and syllogistic reasoning. The intellect receives the images of the object and combines them to forge propositions in order to formulate a conclusion through syllogistic reasoning. Tesauro combines simple metaphor and allegory to propose eight further types: likeness (simiglianza), metonymy or synecdoche (attributione), punning (equivoco), hypotyposis (hipotiposi), hyperbole (hiperboli), laconism (laconismo), opposition or antithesis (oppositione), and deception (decettione). Metaphor is the most incisive of all figures. Its purpose is more than just ornamental; it does not remain on the grammatical surface of words but penetrates and explores the most abstract notions, so that it may combine them and, in so doing, it turns words into concepts.

Contrary to the Spanish term agudeza, which belongs solely to literary or political discourse, wit, according to Tesauro, is not confined merely to language. Besides linguistic arguzia, there also exists that symbolic arguzia, found in the different arts: painting, sculpture, emblems, architecture, pantomime, drama and dance. All the arts share this quality of cleverness, with some arts functioning through words and others by means of symbols.

Tesauro attributes a well-nigh divine quality to wit. He sees ingegno as "vestige of the Divine into the human" (vestigio della Divinità nell'Animo Humano). Like Gracián, who believes that agudeza is our most sublime faculty, promoting us up the hierarchy of creatures, Tesauro considers wit [ingegno] "a marvelous force of the intellect," representing nothing less than the human person's direct participation in divine creative power: through the exercise of his ingegno, the artist or poet produces ex nihilo something completely new and original, in emulation of God's own initial act of creation. "Just as God brings forth that which is out of that which is not, so wit makes something out of nothing". The world is God's poem, which is written in conceits, and God is thus a "witty creator". Thus, the traditional notion of the world as book or the book of nature is subtly transformed into a baroque universe of metaphor, analogy, and conceit in Tesauro's poetics. Connecting apparently unrelated concepts, metaphor reveals the vast net of correspondences which unites the whole multiplicity of being. Metaphor, therefore, is not just a literary or rhetorical figure but an analytic tool that can penetrate the mysteries of God and His creation.

Inventing a metaphor is therefore an act of discovery, an exploration of the subtle network of relationships knitting all things together.

— Emanuele Tesauro, Il cannochiale aristotelico (1654), quoted in summary in Ernest B. Gilman, The Curious Perspective: Literary and Pictorial Wit in the Seventeenth Century (New Haven CT: Yale UP, 1978): 70.

Il cannocchiale aristotelico met with enormous success. Between 1654 and 1702, it went through at least 20 Italian editions and circulated widely throughout Europe in Latin translation. In his Entretiens d'Ariste et d'Eugène published in 1671, the Jesuit Dominique Bouhours repeatedly discusses and criticizes the ideas developed by Tesauro. The influence of Emanuele Tesauro, Baltasar Gracián and Jakob Masen on European mannerism and the rise of the "argutia" movement is well documented in the studies by Miguel Battlori, K.-P. Lange, Wilfried Barner and Barbara Bauer. Hugo Friedrich describes the Cannocchiale aristotelico as a "highpoint of Baroque poetics". Benedetto Croce wrote of Tesauro that he provided "a sketch, an idea, or at least a symbol of what aesthetics was to become". Tesauro's way of rethinking the history of rhetoric and its relationship with logic has been recalled during the eighteenth century by many thinkers, from Vico up to Baumgarten, that interpreted rhetoric tradition.

== In fiction ==
Emanuele Tesauro served as an inspiration for the creation of Father Emanuele, one of the main characters of Umberto Eco's novel The Island of the Day Before.

== Works ==
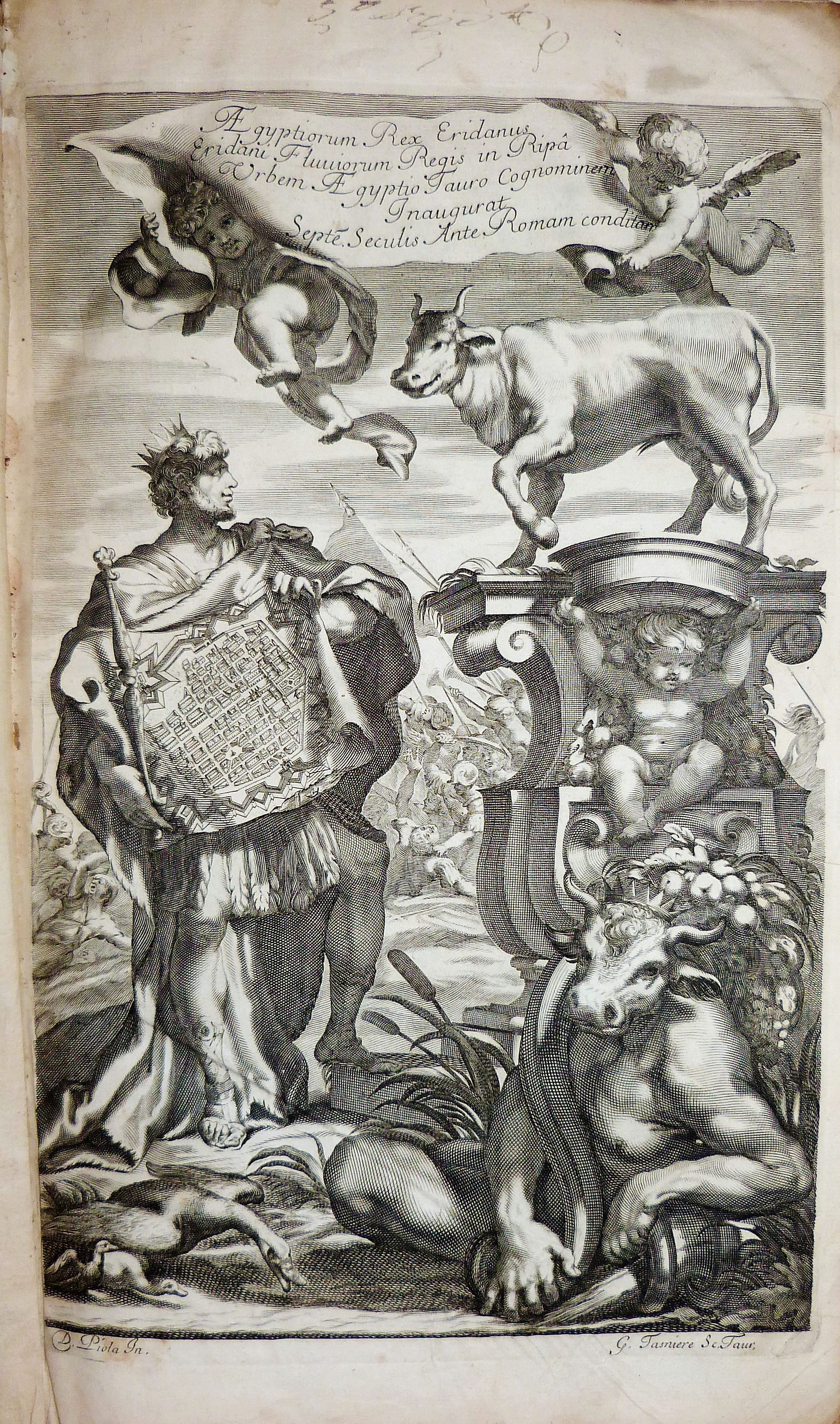
Frontispice of the 1679 edition of Historia dell'Augustissima Città di Torino

- Panegirici sacri. Turin: appresso gli eredi di Gio. Domenico Tarino. 1633.
- R. P. Emanuelis Thesauri e Societate Iesu, Cæsares; et ejusdem varia carmina: quibus accesserunt nobilissimorum Orientis et Occidentis Pontificum elogia et varia opera poetica. Oxford: excudebat Leonardus Lichfield impensis Gulielmi Webb. 1637.
- La politica di Esopo frigio dedicata al Serenissimo Principe Gioseppe Emanuel di Savoia. Ivrea: apresso San Francesco. 1646.
- Il cannocchiale aristotelico, ossia Idea dell'arguta et ingeniosa elocutione che serve a tutta l'Arte oratoria, lapidaria, et simbolica esaminata co' Principij del divino Aristotele. Turin: per Gio. Sinibaldo, Stampator Regio e Camerale. 1654.
- Hippolito, Edipo e Ermenegildo, tragedie, pubblicate insieme. Turin: appresso Bartolomeo Zauatta. 1661.
- Del Regno d'Italia sotto i Barbari [Of the Kingdom of Italy under the Barbarians]. Turin: per Bartolomeo Zavatta. 1664. Tesauro's Del Regno d'Italia sotto i Barbari is of one of the most ambitious baroque historical interpretation of the early barbarian kingdoms of Italy spanning from Alaric's sack of Rome (410) to the 11th century. The work is divided into 3 sections: the post-Roman interim period of Germanic caretaker kings and their Ostrogoth successors, the Lombard kings, and the Frankish rulers followed by kings of Lombard descent. Additional notes printed in double columns are provided by Valeriano Castiglione on pp. 45–48, 111-120, 123-225. This book was one of the principal sources for Alessandro Manzoni's tragedy Adelchi (1822), about the son of the last Lombard king Desiderius, the action taking place in 774 with the protagonist Charlemagne taking over the Kingdom of the Lombards.
- La filosofia morale deriuata dall'alto fonte del grande Aristotele Stagirita, dal conte, et caualier Gran Croce don Emanuele Tesauro. Turin: appresso Bartolomeo Zapata. 1670.
- D. Emmanuelis Thesauri Patritii Taurinensi. Comitis et maiorum insignium equitis SS. Mauritii et Lazari, Inscriptiones quotquot reperiri potuerunt operâ, et diligentiâ D. Emmanuelis Philiberti Panealbi, Equitis, et in Augustotaurinensi Almâ Universitate Sacrorum Canonum Interpretis Primarii. Cum eiusque notis et illustrationibus (in Latin). Turin: Typis Bartholomaei Zapatae. 1670.
- Il cannocchiale aristotelico (in Italian) (5 ed.). Turin: Bartolomeo Zavatta. 1670.
- Apologie in difesa de' libri del conte & caualier Gran Croce D. Emanuele Tesauro. Vol. 1. Turin: Bartolomeo Zavatta. 1673.
- Origine delle guerre civili del Piemonte. Cologne: appresso Giacomo Pindo. 1673.
- L'arte delle lettere missiue del conte d. Emanuele Tesauro. Vindicata dall'obliuione, et dedicata al serenissimo principe di Piemonte dal conte, & caualiere d. Luigi Francesco Morozzo. Turin: per Bartolomeo Zapatta. 1674.
- Campeggiamenti del serenissimo Principe Tomaso di Sauoia descritti dal Conte, e Cauaglier Gran Croce d. Emanuele Tesauro patritio torinese. Turin: per Bartolomeo Zapatta. 1674.
- Historia dell'augusta città di Torino. Turin: per Bartolomeo Zapatta. 1679.
- La vergine trionfante, et il capricorno scornato. Venice: Giovanni Giacomo Hertz. 1680.
