= Six Walks in the Fictional Woods =

Book by Umberto Eco

- First edition
- Author: Umberto Eco
- Language: English
- Subject: Linguistics
- Publisher: Harvard University Press
- Publication date: 1994
- Publication place: United States
- Pages: 153 pp.
- ISBN: 0-674-81050-3
- OCLC: 29184587
- Dewey Decimal: 808.3 20
- LC Class: PN3355 .E28 1994

Six Walks in the Fictional Woods is a non-fiction book by Umberto Eco. Originally delivered at Harvard for the Charles Eliot Norton Lectures in 1992 and 1993, the six lectures were published in the fall of 1994.

== Overview ==
The book derives its title from Italo Calvino's Six Memos for the Next Millennium, but Eco also cites Calvino's If on a Winter's Night a Traveler as inspiration because the novel "is concerned with the presence of the reader in the story", which was also the subject of the lectures and book. Furthermore, it is based on René Descartes' metaphorical representation of a text as a forest where his readers wander, however, without Descartes' hylophobia (fear of forests). In six chapters titled "Entering the Woods", "The Woods of Loisy", "Lingering in the Woods", "Possible Woods", "The Strange Case of Rue Servandon", and "Fictional Protocols", Eco contemplates on storytelling, the process of creation of a literary text, and how readers understand them.

Eco introduces two types of readers and authors – model and empirical ones. Empirical writers and readers are of no interest to Eco as not being part of the text itself. On the contrary, model author and reader are integral parts of the text. The model author, by Eco, is a nexus of discursive strategies that builds the essence of the text. Meanwhile, the model reader is a set of textual instructions, integrated into the narrative. Eco mentioned that his view of a model reader resembled the implied reader of Wolfgang Iser.

Eco suggests two ways through the 'forest' for the 'model' reader: choose a broad path that will help one reach one's destination as quickly as possible, or walk by exploring side paths and figuring out the workings of the 'forest'. The second way, according to Eco, is harder and longer, but provides an incomparably deeper understanding and appreciation of the work. In the second chapter of the book, Eco explains that the 'second level model reader' seeks to understand the narrative strategy realized by the model author, such a reader analyzes the text and extracts from it the structures that affect the recipient, which allow him to 'complete' the text through interpretation. In addition, Eco encourages re-reading books, because each time the text will unfold differently and give room for new interpretations.

The author also discusses the three dimensions of time in a text, and ways to send the reader on an imaginary walk through it. He explains the high value of fiction, how it is able to comfort and reconcile people with the real world through made-up stories, and that fiction helps to overcome our metaphysical limitations.

In Six Walks, Eco demonstrates a wide knowledge of literature. He skillfully draws parallels and examples from a wide range of cultural fields, from modern to classical works of various forms, and does not shy away from peering into the lowest genres. In this book, Eco browses through the works of Edgar Allan Poe, Jorge Luis Borges, James Joyce, Italo Calvino, Marcel Proust. He analyses Gérard de Nerval's Sylvie, Homer's Odyssey, Dante Alighieri's Divine Comedy, The Three Musketeers, and some of his own works such as The Name of the Rose and Foucault's Pendulum.

A book for the sophisticated reader, it was nevertheless extremely popular and topped European bestseller lists for a long time. According to literary scholars, Eco's work as a promoter of humanities knowledge and fiction changed the face of popular culture for decades and generated numerous followers.

== Literature ==
- Efimova, N. N. (2015). "Прогулки среди осин: опыт реконструкции переводческого дискурса" [Walking among the aspens: an experience of reconstructing translation discourse]. Bulletin of A. S. Pushkin Leningrad State University (in Russian). 1 (1): 218–228.
- Hix, H. L. (1994). "Reviewed Work: Six Walks in the Fictional Woods by Umberto Eco". Harvard Review (7): 229. JSTOR 27560307.
- Varsava, J. A. (1994). "Umberto eco, six walks in the fictional woods". Harvard UP: 89–90.
- Garipova, Gulchira Talgatovna (2021). "Философская референция как способ художественного миромоделирования в прозе "Поколения сорокалетних"" [Philosophical reference as a mode of artistic world-modelling in the prose of "Generation of forty-year-olds"]. Philological Sciences. Issues of Theory and Practice (in Russian). 14 (2): 258–263. doi:10.30853/phil210043.
- Barkovskaya, N. V. (2013). "Прием интригующего пересказа (Чудакова М. О. Не для взрослых. Время читать! – М., 2012)" [The technique of intriguing retelling (Chudakova M. O. Not for adults. Time to read! - M., 2012)]. Philological Class (in Russian). 3 (33).
- Stembulski, R. N. (2009). "Систематическое "Эстетическое" сообщение: спецэффекты "Реальности"" [A systematic 'Aesthetic' message: the special effects of Reality]. Bulletin of the Russian State University of Humanities. Philosophy. Sociology. Art History" (in Russian) (15): 61–73.
- Sirotkina, I. E. (2016). "Человеческое движение: семиотический и феноменологический подходы" [Human movement: semiotic and phenomenological approaches]. Практики и интерпретации: журнал филологических, образовательных и культурных исследований (in Russian). 1 (4): 197–212.
