= The Island of the Day Before =

1994 Italian-language novel by Eco

- First edition (Italian)
- Author: Umberto Eco
- Original title: L’isola del giorno prima
- Translator: William Weaver
- Language: Italian
- Publisher: Bompiani (orig.); Secker & Warburg (UK); Harcourt (US)
- Publication date: 1994
- Publication place: Italy
- English publication date: 1995
- Media type: Print (Hardback & Paperback)
- Pages: 513
- ISBN: 0-436-20270-0 (UK); 0151001510 (US)
- OCLC: 33328715

The Island of the Day Before (Italian: L'isola del giorno prima) is a 1994 historical fiction novel by Umberto Eco set in the 17th century during the historical search for the secret of longitude. The central character is Roberto della Griva, an Italian nobleman stranded on a deserted ship in the Pacific Ocean, and his slowly decaying mental state, in a backdrop of Baroque-era science, metaphysics, and cosmology.

== Plot summary ==
Roberto della Griva, a 17th-century Italian nobleman, is the sole survivor of a shipwreck during a fierce storm. He finds himself washed up on an abandoned ship, the Daphne, anchored off a mysterious Pacific island through which, he convinces himself, runs the International Date Line (roughly 180° longitude). The ship is fully provisioned, he discovers, but the crew is missing. Although the shore is very close, Roberto is unable to swim, and is therefore stranded on the ship. With no way of locating himself or finding a way home, Roberto abandons himself to philosophical contemplation, roaming the crewless ship and composing letters to his beloved Lilia, a lady he met in Paris some time prior to his misadventure on the high seas.

Roberto soon discovers he is not alone on the ship. Someone else is stealing eggs from the hens, rummaging through the letters he writes to Lilia: in short, there is an Intruder aboard. Finally Roberto finds out the intruder: an old German Jesuit called Gaspar Wanderdrossel. Wanderdrossel relates to him the mission of the Daphne's crew and the crew's sad ending at the hands of the natives. Gaspar explains to Roberto that his mission was to discover how to measure longitude by charting the eclipses of the moons of Jupiter. He also educates Roberto to other recondite astronomical means being used to seek this measure. The priest comes to take on a mentor role with Roberto. He urges Roberto to learn to swim. Roberto tries and tries again, but fails. Gaspar finds his own way to reach the Island, and Roberto is left alone again. He begins to reminisce about his life and his love. He becomes obsessed about his allegedly evil twin brother, who is split from his own persona through a process reminiscent of the doppelgänger effect, and thus accusing him of all the bad things that happened in his life. The brother takes blame mainly for his bad choices and is present to sweeten the disappointments of life. Through this reminiscence he becomes convinced that all his troubles will end, if only he can reach the land. The story is told from the point of view of a modern editor who has sorted through the man's papers. Exactly how the papers were preserved and eventually handed down to the editor remains a point of conjecture.

This work contains references to Eco's previous novels. In one example, there is a mention of a crucial plot point from Eco's first novel The Name of the Rose.

The novel presupposes a “model reader” who possesses a certain specialist encyclopedic competence, in particular with regard to the aesthetics of Mannerism and the Baroque, although it in no way excludes a more average reading public. A number of characters have been borrowed from historical reality, such as Cardinal Richelieu, Cardinal Mazarin, and Colbert. Many fictional characters owe their names and their ideas to known cultural personalities of the Baroque period, such as Saint-Savin (Savinien de Cyrano de Bergerac), Father Emanuele (Emanuele Tesauro), and Father Gaspar (Gaspar Schott and Athanasius Kircher).

== Critical reception ==
In a review published on The New York Times Book Review on October 22, 1995, Robert Kelly wrote "Every age gets the classics it deserves. I hope we deserve "The Island of the Day Before." If we do, we will not only know the pleasures of a profound and ingenious story artfully told but will experience Renaissance battles, love poems and sea journeys in the age of exploration."

The publication of the German edition in March 1995 was preceded by months of media coverage, which, in various interviews, hints and advance reports, fueled the excitement for the long-awaited third novel by the author of the two world successes The Name of the Rose and the Foucault's Pendulum, and which malicious tongues called "Chronicle of an announced bestseller”. Already two months before publication, when it was reported that the original Italian edition was not selling as well as expected, some newspapers wrote that the new Eco had suffered a "premature media death". When the novel came out, the reaction in the media was mixed. Some critics found it tedious and cluttered, some dismissed it outright harshly.
