= Apocalittici e integrati =

Apocalittici e integrati (Apocalyptic and Integrated [Intellectuals]) is a book of essays published by Umberto Eco in 1964.

In the title essay, the Italian semiologist analyses the theme of mass culture and the mass media. Eco defines as “apocalyptic” those intellectuals (particularly Adorno and Zolla) who express a critical and aristocratic attitude towards modern mass culture, and as “integrated” those who have a naively optimistic vision of it.

The title essay was published in English in the book Apocalypse Postponed (edited by Robert Lumley, Indiana University Press and the British Film Institute, 1994)

== Editions ==
- Apocalittici e integrati: comunicazioni di massa e teorie della cultura di massa, Milan, Bompiani, 1964
- Apocalittici e integrati, Milan, Bompiani, 1965, ISBN 88-452-4838-0
- Apocalittici e integrati, Milan, Bompiani, 1989, ISBN 88-452-1054-5
