= On Ugliness =

2007 book written by Umberto Eco

- English edition
- Editor: Umberto Eco
- Original title: Storia della bruttezza
- Translator: Alastair McEwen
- Cover artist: Quentin Matsys
- Language: Italian
- Subject: Aesthetics, ugliness
- Genre: Essay
- Publisher: IT: Bompiani; UK: Harvill Secker; US: Rizzoli USA
- Publication date: 2007
- Publication place: Italy
- English publication date: 2007
- Media type: Print (hardcover)
- Pages: 455 pp.
- Preceded by: On Beauty: A History of a Western Idea

On Ugliness (Italian: Storia della bruttezza) is a 2007 essay edited by Italian author Umberto Eco, originally published by Bompiani in 2007. The book is a continuation of Eco's 2004 aesthetic work On Beauty: A History of a Western Idea. Like the previous work, this essay combines literary excerpts and illustrations of artworks from ancient times to the present to define the concept of what it means to be ugly. "Ugliness is more fun than beauty", said Eco himself and some other reviews.

== Synopsis ==
Eco begins with an introduction trying to define the idea of ugliness, to verify that it is a polysemic concept, and that is associated with emotional expressions such as rejection or disgust which impede a rational approach. The first chapter approaches the Greek conception of beauty, trying to discern by opposition what is ugly, and ugliness is associated with the lack of harmony according to ancient Greeks.

Ugliness is not only in the physical but also in the moral sense, Christianity denies to some extent the existence of ugliness, since the whole universe is a divine work and God can not create something ugly if He is a perfect being. Only sin and suffering are ugly because they move away from the precepts of faith. That is why everything monstrous or disgusting links to hell, the art of death and demon exaggerates the horrific features of this sphere to instill the fear of the believers, to prevent them from being tempted.

A second topic begins in chapter 5, with the association between ugly and obscenity, and also absurdity, which can make people laugh. Humour thus indicates the aesthetic measure, as seen in the costumbrist descriptions or the art of caricature, where women and enemies are easy targets of jokes about ugliness.

In the present day, new aesthetic categories are added to the traditional dichotomy between beauty and ugliness, such as kitsch and camp. The book ends with a review of the current polysemy of ugliness, in line with postmodern relativism.

== Contents ==
1. Ugliness in the Classical World
2. Passion, Death, Martyrdom
3. The Apocalypse, Hell, and the Devil
4. Monsters and Portents
5. The Ugly, the Comic, and the Obscene
6. The Ugliness of Woman from Antiquity to the Baroque Period
7. The Devil in the Modern World
8. Witchcraft, Satanism, Sadism
9. Physica curiosa
10. Romanticism and the Redemption of Ugliness
11. The Uncanny
12. Iron Towers and Ivory Towers
13. The Avant-Garde and the Triumph of Ugliness
14. The Ugliness of Others, Kitsch, and Camp
15. Ugliness Today

== Reception ==
The Independent: "Though sales of this anthology of the repellent and weird are unlikely to match those of Eco's On Beauty, published two years ago, this is by far the more interesting. […] this book is full of amazements." New York Public Library: "On Ugliness is an extraordinary road map to the perception of the grotesque over the centuries."
