= Belief or Nonbelief? =

1996 book by Umberto Eco and Carlo Maria Martini

- Author: Umberto Eco, Carlo Maria Martini
- Original title: In cosa crede chi non crede?
- Language: Italian
- Subject: Religion
- Genre: Non-fiction
- Publisher: Arcade Publishing
- Publication date: 1996
- Publication place: Italy
- English publication date: January 12, 2000
- Media type: Print (hardback, paperback), e-book
- Pages: 160 pages
- ISBN: 1559704977

Belief or Nonbelief? (originally published in Italian as In cosa crede chi non crede?) is a 1996 non-fiction book by Umberto Eco and Cardinal Carlo Maria Martini. The book was first published on January 12, 2000, through Arcade Publishing and consists of a dialogue between Eco and Martini about the subject of religion.

The book was named one of the Los Angeles Times' "Best Nonfiction Of 2000".

== Synopsis ==
Belief or Nonbelief? has eight chapters, during which Eco and Cardinal Martini discuss various topics such as religion, belief, abortion, and ethics. The book's title refers to "the beliefs of those who do not believe in God or religious dogmas".

== Reception ==
Critical reception for the book was mostly positive. The Los Angeles Times and the Dallas Morning News both gave positive reviews for Belief or Nonbelief?, with the Los Angeles Times calling it a "short but challenging book".
