= Numero Zero =

2015 Italian novel by Umberto Eco

- First edition
- Author: Umberto Eco
- Original title: Numero zero
- Translator: Richard Dixon
- Language: Italian
- Genre: Mystery
- Publisher: Bompiani; Houghton Mifflin Harcourt (Eng. trans. US); Harvill Secker (Eng. trans UK)
- Publication date: January 2015
- Publication place: Italy
- English publication date: 3 November 2015
- Media type: Print (Hardcover)
- Pages: 192 pp. (hardcover edition)
- ISBN: 978-0544635081
- OCLC: 903284650

Numero Zero (Italian: Numero zero, "Number zero") is the seventh novel by Italian author and philosopher Umberto Eco and his final novel released during his lifetime. It was first published in January 2015; the English translation by Richard Dixon appeared in November 2015. It is a satire of the tabloid press, set in Italy in 1992.

== Plot summary ==
The story is told by Colonna, a hack journalist, now in his fifties, and a loser. He is hired by Simei to work on a newspaper called Domani (Tomorrow) that will never be published. The venture is financed by Commendator Vimercate, who owns a television channel, a dozen magazines and runs a chain of hotels and rest homes. The declared aim of the newspaper is to reveal the truth about everything, to publish all the news that's fit to print "plus a little more," but Commendator Vimercate's true interest lies elsewhere. His "zero issues" will be seen by powerful figures high up in the world of finance and politics who don't want the truth to be revealed. They'll put pressure on Vimercate to close down the newspaper and, in return, will allow him into the inner sanctum of power.

Colonna meets the other members of the editorial staff: Braggadocio used to work for a scandal magazine called What They Never Tell Us; Cambria spent his nights as a hack reporter hanging around police stations; Lucidi probably works for the secret service; Palatino has spent his career working on puzzle and crossword magazines; Costanza was a sub-editor for various newspapers until they grew so large that no one bothered any longer to check what was being printed; lastly, Maia Fresia worked on a celebrity romance magazine.

Colonna is befriended by Braggadocio, a paranoid who sees conspiracies all around him. He tells Colonna he is investigating a story about Mussolini that would sell a hundred thousand copies of Domani. He has a theory that Mussolini managed to avoid being killed during the last days of World War II—the corpse strung up in Milan was a double, the real Mussolini was smuggled away by Church authorities and spent his final years in Argentina (or perhaps behind the walls of the Vatican) waiting for a Fascist coup that might restore him to power.

At the same time, Colonna starts a romantic relationship with Maia, who is a smart and sharp-witted but eccentric young woman, and Braggadocio suspects she may have autism.

Eco's plot is woven around a succession of events from the final days of the Second World War to the terrorist attacks of the 1970s, with references to many figures from the past seventy years of Italian history: fascists and partisans, presidents and prime ministers (Aldo Moro, Francesco Cossiga, Giulio Andreotti), popes (John Paul I and John Paul II), bankers (Michele Sindona, Roberto Calvi, Cardinal Marcinkus) and secret organizations (Special Operations Executive, CIA, Operation Gladio and the Red Brigades).

== See also ==
- Death of Benito Mussolini
- Operation Gladio
- Red Brigades
