= The Mysterious Flame of Queen Loana =

2004 novel by Umberto Eco

- First edition (Italian)
- Author: Umberto Eco
- Original title: La Misteriosa fiamma della Regina Loana
- Translator: Geoffrey Brock
- Language: Italian
- Genre: Historical novel, Mystery
- Publisher: Bompiani (Italy) Harcourt (US)
- Publication date: 2004
- Publication place: Italy
- English publication date: 2005
- Media type: Print (Hardcover)
- Pages: 480 pp
- ISBN: 0-15-101140-0
- OCLC: 60315675
- Dewey Decimal: 853/.912 22
- LC Class: PQ4865.C6 M5713 2005

The Mysterious Flame of Queen Loana (original Italian title: La Misteriosa Fiamma della Regina Loana) is a novel by the Italian writer Umberto Eco. It was first published in Italian in 2004, and an English language translation by Geoffrey Brock was published in spring 2005. The title is taken from the title of an Italian edition album of an episode of the American comic strip Tim Tyler's Luck.

== Plot ==
The plot of the book concerns Yambo (full name: Giambattista Bodoni, just like the typographer Giambattista Bodoni), a 59-year-old Milanese antiquarian book dealer who loses his episodic memory due to a stroke. At the beginning of the novel, he can remember everything he has ever read but does not remember his family, his past, or even his own name. Yambo decides to go to Solara, his childhood home, parts of which he has abandoned following a family tragedy, to see if he can rediscover his lost past. After days of searching through old newspapers, vinyl records, books, magazines and childhood comic books, he is unsuccessful in regaining memories, though he relives the story of his generation and the society in which his dead parents and grandfather lived. Ready to abandon his quest, he discovers a copy of the original First Folio of 1623 among his grandfather's books, the shock of which causes another incident, during which he relives his lost memories of childhood. The final section of the book is, therefore, a literary exploration of the traditional phenomenon whereby a person's life flashes before him or her, as Yambo struggles to regain the one memory he seeks above all others: the face of the girl he loved ever since he was a student.

Umberto Eco includes references to both scholarly and popular culture in the book (notably the Flash Gordon strips) and draws heavily on his own experiences growing up in Benito Mussolini's Fascist Italy. Like other Eco novels, The Mysterious Flame of Queen Loana uses intertextuality.

== Critical reception ==
The novel received generally positive reviews. On Metacritic, which assigns a weighted mean rating out of 0–100 reviews from professional reviewers, the book achieved a rating score of 65 based on 23 reviews.
