= The Infinity of Lists =

2009 book by Umberto Eco

- First edition (publ. Bompiani)
- Author: Umberto Eco
- Original title: La Vertigine della Lista
- Language: English
- Subject: Lists
- Genre: Non-fiction
- Publisher: Louvre
- ISBN: 978-0847832965

The Infinity of Lists (Note: Originally published in Italian as La Vertigine della Lista (The Vertigo of Lists).) is a 2009 book by Umberto Eco on the topic of lists. It was produced in collaboration with the Louvre.

The examples of lists in the work range from Hesiod's list of the progeny of gods to Rabelais's list of bottom wipes.

== Reception ==
Simon Schama, writing for Financial Times, described the book (in list form) as a delight: "profuse, plethoric, prolix, plentiful, playful, populous, picaresque, picturesque; copious, cornucopian, congested, clotted; incontinent, infested, infectious; omnivorous, orgiastic, odd; abundant, redundant; multifarious, multitudinous; glutted, gargantuan, inclusive, elusive, and...exhaustive." However, Schama also described it as exasperating: "If its pleasures easily overwhelm its irritants, that's because the book has the charm of extreme greed."

== See also ==
- The Book of Lists
- List of lists of lists
