= Umberto Eco =

Italian semiotician, philosopher and writer (1932–2016)

Umberto Eco OMRI
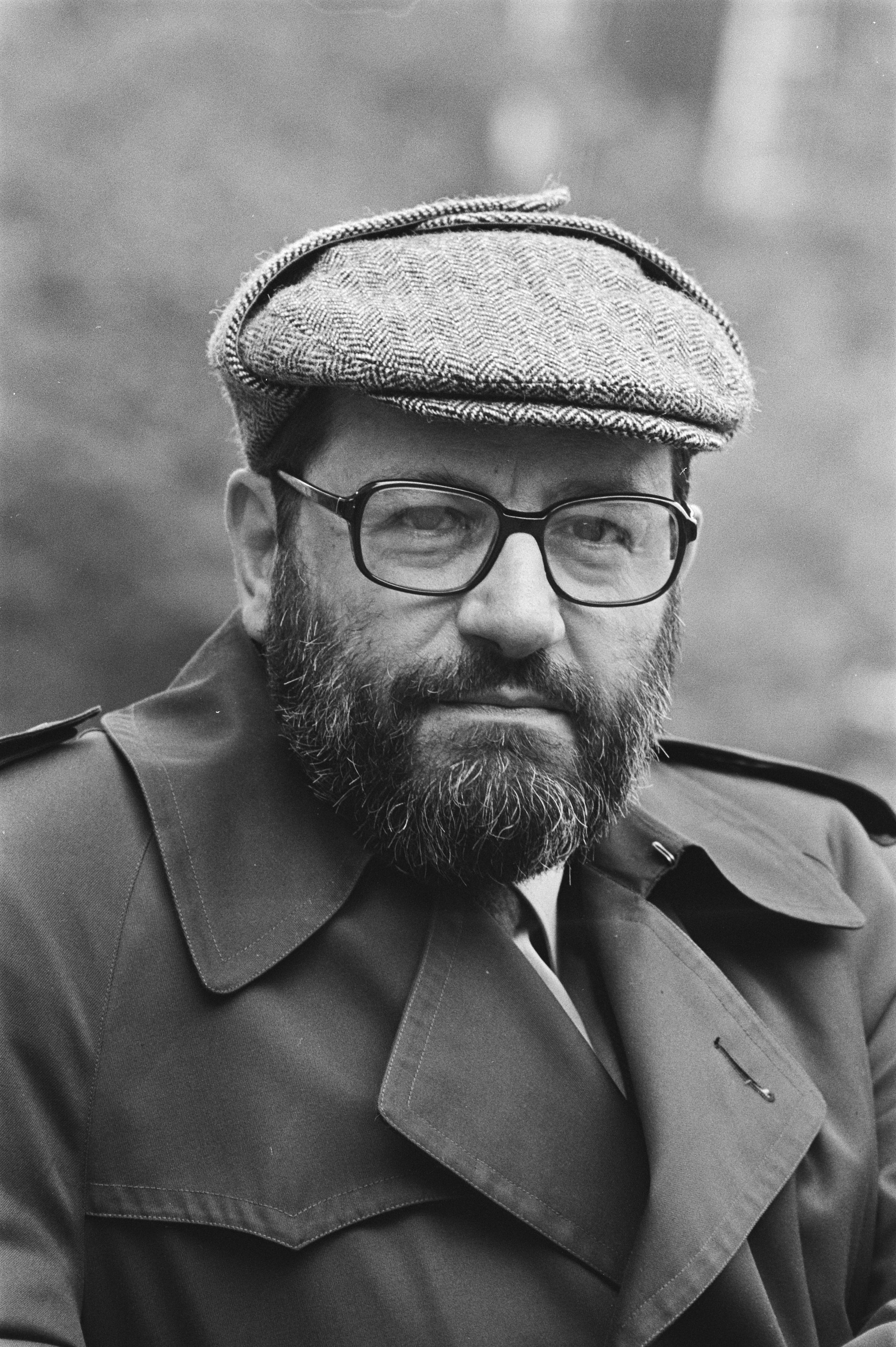
- Eco in 1984
- Born: 5 January 1932; Alessandria, Kingdom of Italy
- Died: 19 February 2016 (aged 84); Milan, Italy
- Occupations: Medievalist; philosopher; semiotician; novelist; cultural critic; political commentator; social commentator
- Spouse: Renate Ramge (m. 1962)
- Children: 2

Education
- Education: University of Turin
- Academic advisor: Luigi Pareyson

Philosophical work
- Era: 20th-/21st-century philosophy
- Region: Western philosophy
- School: Continental philosophy Post-structuralism
- Institutions: University of Milan; University of Florence; University of Bologna; University of the Republic of San Marino
- Main interests: Semiotics (literary semiotics, film semiotics, comics semiotics)
- Notable ideas: The open work (opera aperta); the intention of the reader (intentio lectoris); the limits of interpretation

Umberto Eco (Note: English: /ˈɛkoʊ/ EK-oh; Italian: [umˈbɛrto ˈɛːko].) (5 January 1932 – 19 February 2016) was an Italian medievalist, philosopher, semiotician, novelist, cultural critic, and political and social commentator. In English, he is best known for his popular 1980 novel The Name of the Rose, a historical mystery combining semiotics in fiction with biblical analysis, medieval studies and literary theory, as well as Foucault's Pendulum, his 1988 novel which touches on the history of occultism and its contemporary interpretation through the new age movement.

Eco wrote prolifically throughout his life, with his output including children's books, translations from French and English, in addition to a twice-monthly newspaper column "La Bustina di Minerva" (Minerva's Matchbook) in the magazine L'Espresso beginning in 1985, with his last column (a critical appraisal of the Romantic paintings of Francesco Hayez) appearing 27 January 2016. At the time of his death, he was an Emeritus professor at the University of Bologna, where he taught for much of his life. In the 21st century, he has continued to gain recognition for his 1995 essay "Ur-Fascism", where Eco lists fourteen general properties he believes comprise fascist ideologies.

== Early life and education ==
Eco was born on 5 January 1932 in the city of Alessandria, in Piedmont in northern Italy. His father, Giulio, one of thirteen children, was an accountant before the government called him to serve in three wars. During World War II, Umberto and his mother, Giovanna (Bisio), moved to a small village in the Piedmontese mountainside. His village was liberated in 1945, and he was exposed to American comic books, the European Resistance, and the Holocaust. Eco received a Salesian education and made references to the order and its founder in his works and interviews. The spread of Italian fascism throughout the region influenced his childhood. At the age of ten, he received the First Provincial Award of Ludi Juveniles after responding positively to the young Italian fascist writing prompt of "Should we die for the glory of Mussolini and the immortal destiny of Italy?"

Towards the end of his life, Eco came to believe that his family name was an acronym of ex caelis oblatus (from Latin: a gift from the heavens). As was the custom at the time, the name had been given to his grandfather (a foundling) by an official in city hall. In a 2011 interview, Eco explained that a friend happened to come across the acronym on a list of Jesuit acronyms in the Vatican Library, informing him of the likely origin of the name.

Umberto's father urged him to become a lawyer, but he entered the University of Turin (UNITO), writing his thesis on the aesthetics of medieval philosopher and theologian Thomas Aquinas under the supervision of Luigi Pareyson, for which he earned his Laurea degree in philosophy in 1954.

== Career ==
=== Medieval aesthetics and philosophy (1954–1968) ===
After graduating, Eco worked for the state broadcasting station Radiotelevisione Italiana (RAI) in Milan, producing a variety of cultural programming. Following the publication of his first book in 1956, he became an assistant lecturer at his alma mater. In 1958, Eco left RAI and the University of Turin to complete 18 months of compulsory military service in the Italian Army.

In 1959, following his return to university teaching, Eco was approached by Valentino Bompiani to edit a series on "Idee nuove" (New Ideas) for his eponymous publishing house in Milan. According to the publisher, he became aware of Eco through his short pamphlet of cartoons and verse Filosofi in libertà (Philosophers in Freedom, or Liberated Philosophers), which had originally been published in a limited print run of 550 under the James Joyce-inspired pseudonym Daedalus.

That same year, Eco published his second book, Sviluppo dell'estetica medievale (The Development of Medieval Aesthetics), a scholarly monograph building on his work on Aquinas. Earning his libera docenza in aesthetics in 1961, Eco was promoted to the position of lecturer in the same subject in 1963, before leaving the University of Turin to take a position as lecturer in Architecture at the University of Milan in 1964.

=== Early writings on semiotics and popular culture (1961–1964) ===
Among his work for a general audience, in 1961 Eco's short essay "Phenomenology of Mike Bongiorno", a critical analysis of a popular but unrefined quiz show host, appeared as part of a series of articles by Eco on mass media published in the magazine of the tyre manufacturer Pirelli. In it, Eco observed that "[Bongiorno] does not provoke inferiority complexes, despite presenting himself as an idol, and the public acknowledge him, by being grateful to him and loving him. He represents an ideal that nobody need strive to reach because everyone is already at his level." Receiving notoriety among the general public thanks to widespread media coverage, the essay was later included in the collection Diario minimo (1963).

Over this period, Eco began seriously developing his ideas on the "open" text and on semiotics, writing many essays on these subjects. In 1962 he published Opera aperta (translated into English as "The Open Work"). In it, Eco argued that literary texts are fields of meaning, rather than strings of meaning; and that they are understood as open, internally dynamic and psychologically engaged fields. Literature which limits one's potential understanding to a single, unequivocal line, the closed text, remains the least rewarding, while texts which are the most active between mind, society and life (open texts) are the liveliest and best—although valuation terminology was not his primary focus. Eco came to these positions through the study of language and from semiotics, rather than from psychology or historical analysis (as did theorists such as Wolfgang Iser, on the one hand, and Hans Robert Jauss, on the other).

In his 1964 book Apocalittici e integrati, lit. 'The Apocalyptic and the Integrated', Eco continued his exploration of popular culture, analyzing the phenomenon of mass communication from a sociological perspective.

=== Visual communication and semiological guerrilla warfare (1965–1975) ===
From 1965 to 1969, he was Professor of Visual Communications at the University of Florence, where he gave the influential lecture "Towards a Semiological Guerrilla Warfare", which coined the influential term "semiological guerrilla", and influenced the theorization of guerrilla tactics against mainstream mass media culture, such as guerrilla television and culture jamming. Among the expressions used in the essay are "communications guerrilla warfare" and "cultural guerrilla". The essay was later included in Eco's book Faith in Fakes.

Eco's approach to semiotics is often referred to as "interpretative semiotics". In his first book-length elaboration, his theory appears in La struttura assente (1968; literally: The Absent Structure).

In 1969 he left to become Professor of Semiotics at Milan Polytechnic, spending his first year as a visiting professor at New York University. In 1971 he took up a position as associate professor at the University of Bologna and spent 1972 as a Fulbright scholar at Northwestern University. Following the publication of A Theory of Semiotics in 1975, he was promoted to Professor of Semiotics at the University of Bologna. That same year, Eco stepped down from his position as senior non-fiction editor at Bompiani.

=== The Name of the Rose and Foucault's Pendulum (1975–1988) ===
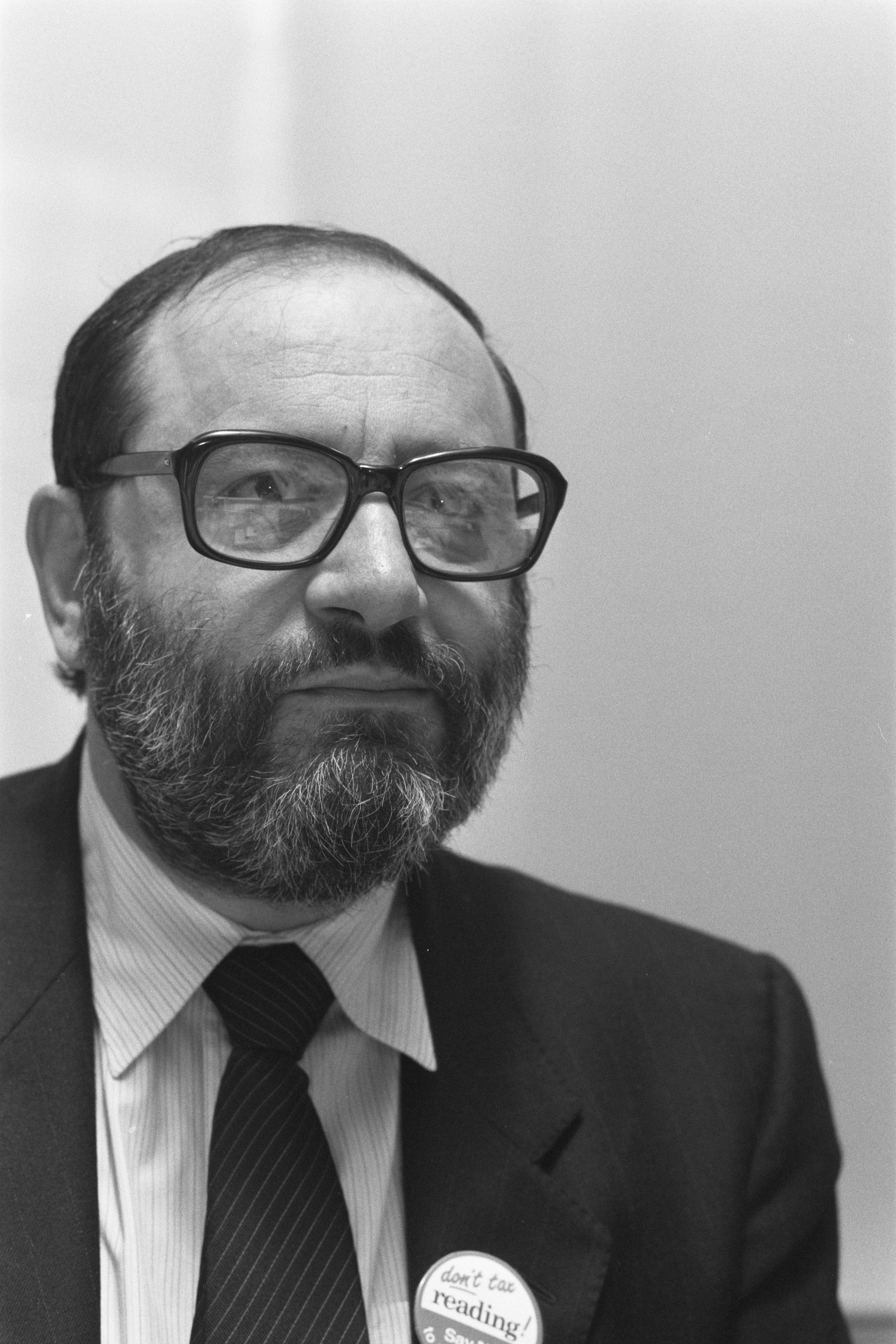
Eco in 1987

From 1977 to 1978 Eco was a visiting professor at Yale University and then at Columbia University. He returned to Yale from 1980 to 1981, and Columbia in 1984. During this time he completed The Role of the Reader (1979) and Semiotics and the Philosophy of Language (1984).

Eco drew on his background as a medievalist in his first novel The Name of the Rose (1980), a historical mystery set in a 14th-century monastery. Franciscan friar William of Baskerville, aided by his assistant Adso, a Benedictine novice, investigates a series of murders at a monastery that is to host an important religious debate. The novel contains many direct or indirect metatextual references to other sources that require the detective work of the reader to "solve". The title is unexplained in the body of the book, but at the end, there is a Latin verse "Stat rosa pristina nomine, nomina nuda tenemus" (transl. "the ancient rose remains in name; we hold [only] the bare names."). The rose serves as an example of the destiny of all remarkable things. There is a tribute to Jorge Luis Borges, a major influence on Eco, in the character Jorge of Burgos: Borges, like the blind monk Jorge, lived a celibate life consecrated to his passion for books, and also went blind in later life. The labyrinthine library in The Name of the Rose also alludes to Borges's short story "The Library of Babel". William of Baskerville is a logical-minded Englishman who is a friar and a detective. His name evokes both William of Ockham and Sherlock Holmes (by way of The Hound of the Baskervilles); several passages which describe him are strongly reminiscent of Sir Arthur Conan Doyle's descriptions of Holmes.

The Name of the Rose was later made into a film of the same name, which follows the plot, though not the philosophical and historical themes, of the novel. The novel was also adapted into a made-for-television mini-series.

In Foucault's Pendulum (1988), three under-employed editors who work for a minor publishing house decide to amuse themselves by inventing a conspiracy theory. Their conspiracy, which they call "The Plan", is about an immense and intricate plot to take over the world by a secret order descended from the Knights Templar. As the game goes on, the three slowly become obsessed with the details of this plan. The game turns dangerous when outsiders learn of The Plan and believe that the men have really discovered the secret to regaining the lost treasure of the Templars.

=== Anthropology of the West and The Island of the Day Before (1988–2000) ===
In 1988, Eco founded the Department of Media Studies at the University of the Republic of San Marino, and in 1992 he founded the Institute of Communication Disciplines at the University of Bologna, later founding the Higher School for the Study of the Humanities at the same institution.

In 1988, at the University of Bologna, Eco created an unusual program called Anthropology of the West from the perspective of non-Westerners (African and Chinese scholars), as defined by their own criteria. Eco developed this transcultural international network based on the idea of Alain le Pichon in West Africa. The Bologna program resulted in the first conference in Guangzhou, China, in 1991 entitled "Frontiers of Knowledge". The first event was soon followed by an Itinerant Euro-Chinese seminar on "Misunderstandings in the Quest for the Universal" along the silk trade route from Guangzhou to Beijing. The latter culminated in a book entitled The Unicorn and the Dragon, which discussed the question of the creation of knowledge in China and in Europe. Scholars contributing to this volume were from China, including Tang Yijie, Wang Bin and Yue Daiyun, as well as from Europe: Furio Colombo, Antoine Danchin, Jacques Le Goff, Paolo Fabbri and Alain Rey.

Eco published The Limits of Interpretation in 1990.

From 1992 to 1993, Eco was a visitor at Harvard, as the Charles Eliot Norton Professor of Poetry. His Norton Lectures were subsequently collected and published as Six Walks in the Fictional Woods by Harvard University Press in 1994.

That same year, Eco published his third novel, The Island of the Day Before (1994). The book, set in the 17th century, is about a man stranded on a ship within sight of an island which he believes is on the other side of the international date-line. The main character is trapped by his inability to swim and instead spends the bulk of the book reminiscing on his life and the adventures that brought him to be stranded.

Eco's 1995 essay "Ur-Fascism", also published as "Eternal Fascism: Fourteen Ways of Looking at a Blackshirt", received renewed attention in the twenty-first century. In the essay Eco described fascism as a "fuzzy" set of recurring political and cultural traits, and listed fourteen features of what he called "Ur-Fascism" or "Eternal Fascism". The essay was later republished in Italian as a stand-alone volume and included in the English-language collection ''How to Spot a Fascist''.

He returned to semiotics in Kant and the Platypus in 1997, a book which Eco reputedly warned his fans away from, saying, "This a hard-core book. It's not a page-turner. You have to stay on every page for two weeks with your pencil. In other words, don't buy it if you are not Einstein."

From 2001 to 2002, Eco was the Weidenfeld Visiting Professor in Comparative European Literature at St Anne's College, Oxford.

In 2000, a seminar in Timbuktu was followed up with another gathering in Bologna to reflect on the conditions of reciprocal knowledge between East and West. This, in turn, gave rise to a series of conferences in Brussels, Paris and Goa, culminating in Beijing in 2007. The topics of the Beijing conference were "Order and Disorder", "New Concepts of War and Peace", "Human Rights" and "Social Justice and Harmony". Eco presented the opening lecture. Among those giving presentations were anthropologists Balveer Arora, Varun Sahni, and Rukmini Bhaya Nair from India, Moussa Sow from Africa, Roland Marti and Maurice Olender from Europe, Cha Insuk from Korea, and Huang Ping and Zhao Tingyang from China. Also on the program were scholars from the fields of law and science including Antoine Danchin, Ahmed Djebbar and Dieter Grimm. Eco's interest in east–west dialogue to facilitate international communication and understanding also correlates with his related interest in the international auxiliary language Esperanto.

=== Later novels and writing (2000–2016) ===
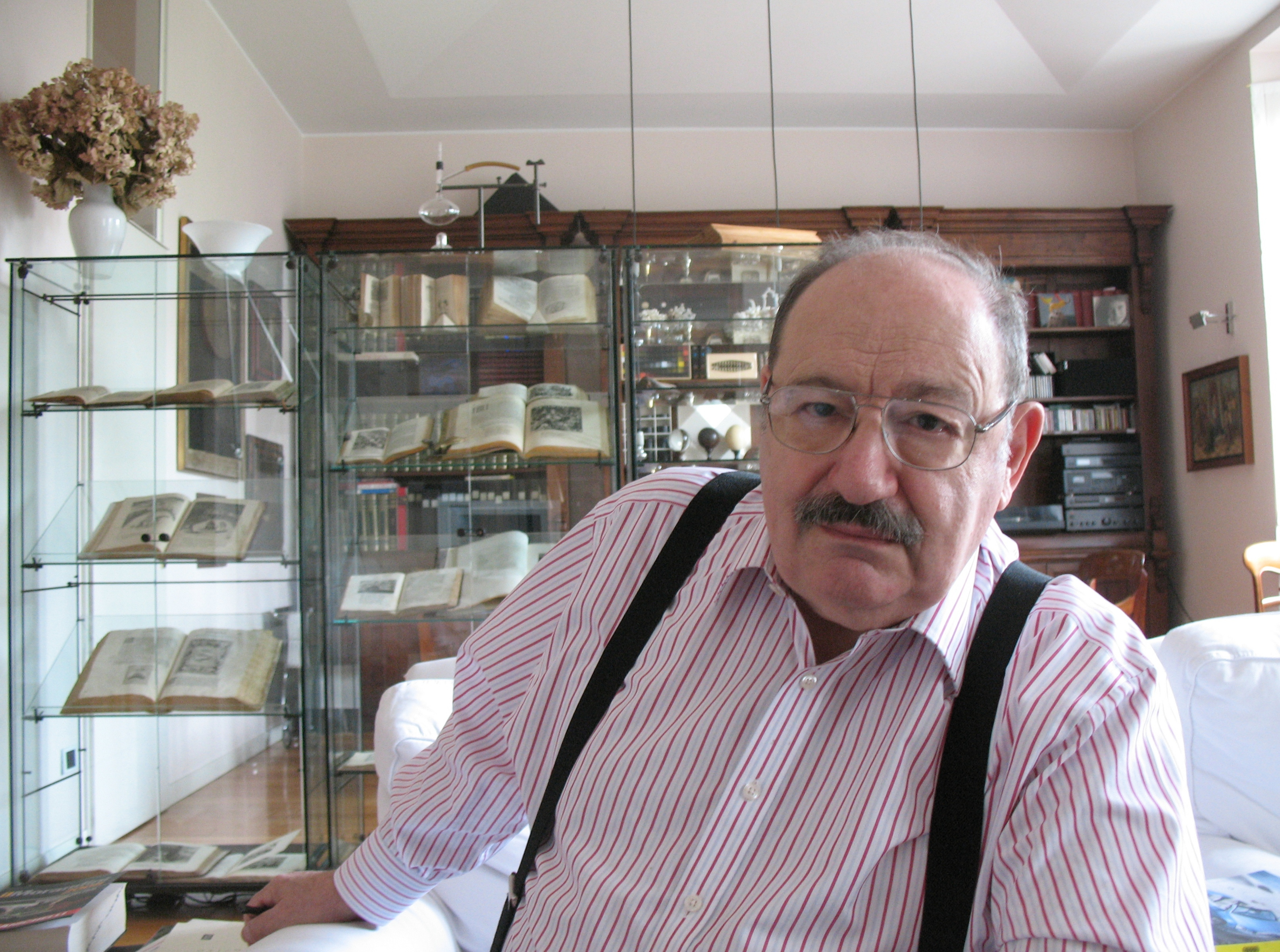
Eco at his home in 2010

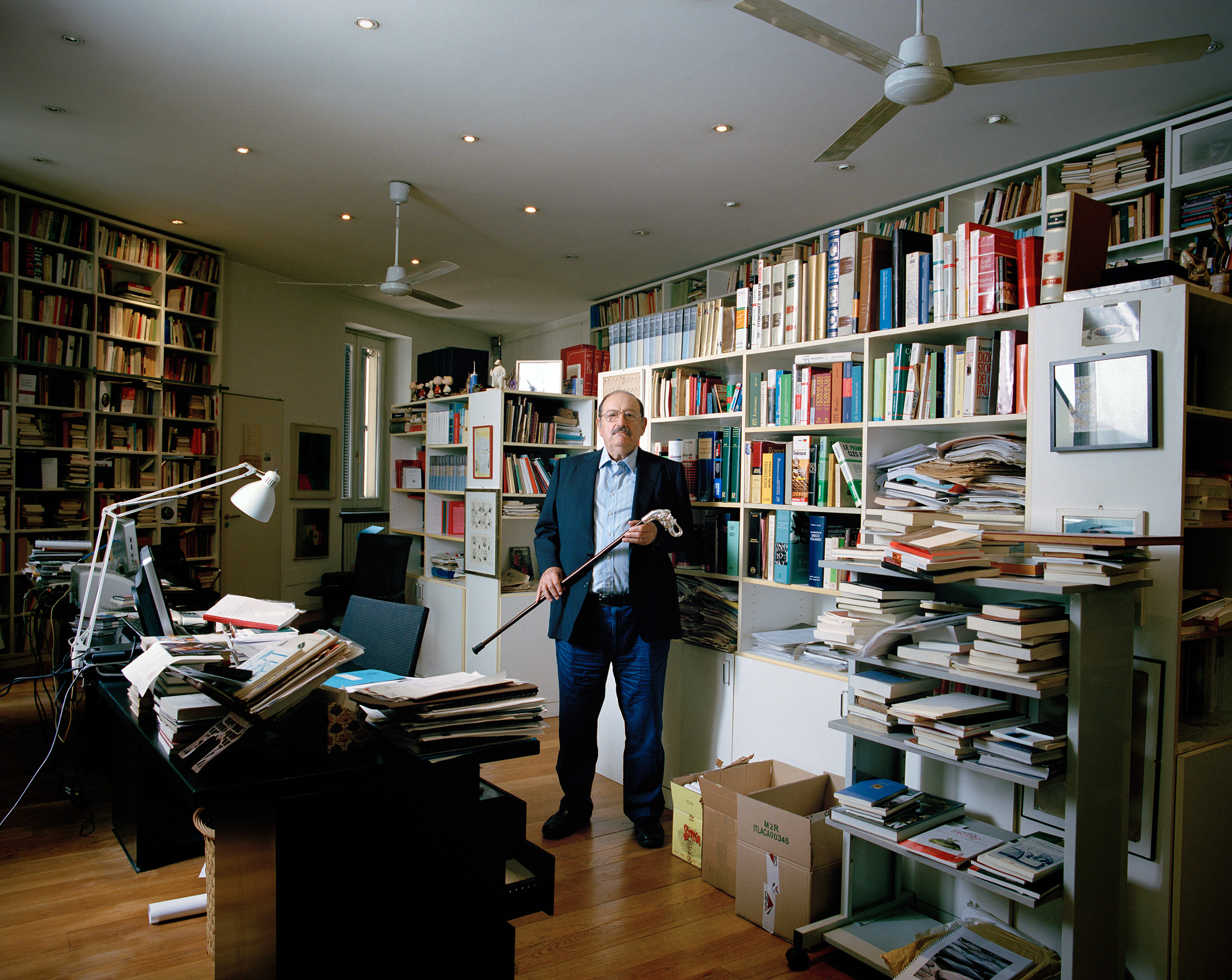
Umberto Eco in his Milan apartment library (September 2011). The portrait by Oliver Mark was taken for an interview with the weekly newspaper Die ZEIT.

Baudolino was published in 2000. Baudolino is a much-travelled polyglot Piedmontese scholar who saves the Byzantine historian Niketas Choniates during the sack of Constantinople in the Fourth Crusade. Claiming to be an accomplished liar, he confides his history, from his childhood as a peasant lad endowed with a vivid imagination, through his role as adopted son of Emperor Frederick Barbarossa, to his mission to visit the mythical realm of Prester John. Throughout his retelling, Baudolino brags about his ability to swindle and tell tall tales, leaving the historian (and the reader) unsure of just how much of his story was a lie.

The Mysterious Flame of Queen Loana (2005) is about Giambattista Bodoni, an old bookseller specializing in antiques who emerges from a coma with only some memories to recover his past. Bodoni is pressed to make a very difficult choice, one between his past and his future. He must either abandon his past to live his future or regain his past and sacrifice his future.

Eco's Dall'albero al labirinto: Studi storici sul segno e l'interpretazione was published by Bompiani in 2007. Anthony Oldcorn's English translation, From the Tree to the Labyrinth: Historical Studies on the Sign and Interpretation, was published by Harvard University Press in 2014.

The Prague Cemetery, Eco's sixth novel, was published in 2010. It is the story of a secret agent who "weaves plots, conspiracies, intrigues and attacks, and helps determine the historical and political fate of the European Continent". The book is a narrative of the rise of Modern-day antisemitism, by way of the Dreyfus affair, The Protocols of the Elders of Zion and other important 19th-century events which gave rise to hatred and hostility toward the Jewish people. To coincide with the release of the translation, Eco gave a widely noted interview with the weekly newspaper Die ZEIT under the title "Die Macht der Dummen" ("The Power of the Fools"), discussing conspiracy theories, antisemitism, and Silvio Berlusconi. The accompanying portrait by Oliver Mark was taken for this feature in Eco's Milan apartment in front of his private library, which at the time comprised over 30,000 contemporary and 1,500 antique volumes.

In 2012, Eco and Jean-Claude Carrière published a book of conversations on the future of information carriers. Eco criticized social networks, saying for example that "Social media gives legions of idiots the right to speak when they once only spoke at a bar after a glass of wine, without harming the community ... but now they have the same right to speak as a Nobel Prize winner. It's the invasion of the idiots."

Numero Zero was published in 2015. Set in 1992 and narrated by Colonna, a hack journalist working for a Milan newspaper, it offers a satire of Italy's kickback and bribery culture as well as, among many things, the legacy of fascism.

== Influences and themes ==
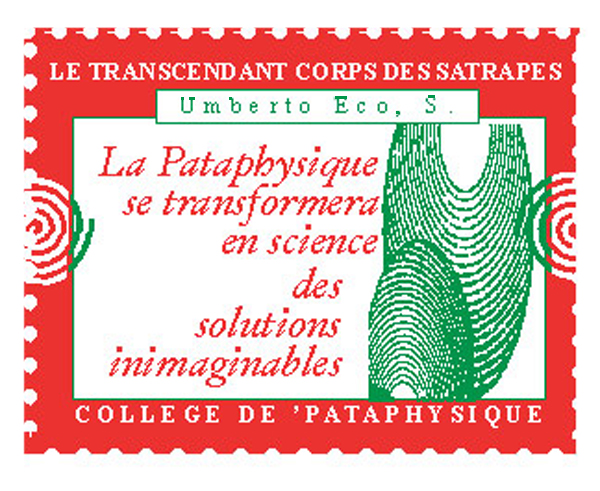
Collège de 'Pataphysique, stamp of Satrap Umberto Eco. By Jean-Max Albert Rt, 2001

A group of avant-garde artists, painters, musicians and writers, whom he had befriended at RAI, the Neoavanguardia or Gruppo '63, became an important and influential component in Eco's writing career.

In 1971, Eco co-founded Versus: Quaderni di studi semiotici (known as VS among Italian academics), a semiotic journal. VS is used by scholars whose work is related to signs and signification. The journal's foundation and activities have contributed to semiotics as an academic field in its own right, both in Italy and in the rest of Europe. Most of the well-known European semioticians, including Eco, A. J. Greimas, Jean-Marie Floch, and Jacques Fontanille, as well as philosophers and linguists like John Searle and George Lakoff, have published original articles in VS. His work with Serbian and Russian scholars and writers included thoughts on Milorad Pavić and a meeting with Alexander Genis.

Beginning in the early 1990s, Eco collaborated with artists and philosophers such as Enrico Baj, Jean Baudrillard, and Donald Kuspit to publish a number of tongue-in-cheek texts on the imaginary science of 'pataphysics.

Eco's fiction has enjoyed a wide audience around the world, with many translations. His novels are full of subtle, often multilingual, references to literature and history. Eco's work illustrates the concept of intertextuality, or the inter-connectedness of all literary works. Eco cited James Joyce and Jorge Luis Borges as the two modern authors who have influenced his work the most.

Umberto Eco did not consider hypertexts a valid support for a novel. In his opinion, multimedia added nothing to the cultural value of the work; it only integrated its contents. In 1995, during a presentation at the Milan Triennale University, he declared: "I have seen several multimedia works, and I personally collaborated in the drafting of a publication of this type. They gave me a computer on which to run the finished work, but now remotely of just one year this machine is already outdated, rendered obsolete and unusable with the most recent multimedia works."

Eco was also a translator: he translated into Italian Raymond Queneau's Exercices de style (1947). Eco's translation was published under the title Esercizi di stile in 1983. He was also the translator of Sylvie, a novella by Gérard de Nerval.

== Critical reception and legacy ==
As an academic studying philosophy, semiotics, and culture, Eco divided critics as to whether his theorizing should be seen as brilliant or an unnecessary vanity project obsessing over minutiae, while his fiction writing stunned critics with its simultaneous complexity and popularity. In his 1980 review of The Role of the Reader, philosopher Roger Scruton, attacking Eco's esoteric tendencies, writes that, "[Eco seeks] the rhetoric of technicality, the means of generating so much smoke for so long that the reader will begin to blame his own lack of perception, rather than the author's lack of illumination, for the fact that he has ceased to see." In his 1986 review of Faith in Fakes and Art and Beauty in the Middle Ages, art historian Nicholas Penny, meanwhile, accuses Eco of pandering, writing "I suspect that Eco may have first been seduced from intellectual caution, if not modesty, by the righteous cause of 'relevance' (a word much in favour when the earlier of these essays appeared) – a cause which Medievalists may be driven to embrace with particularly desperate abandon."

At the other end of the spectrum, Eco has been praised for his levity and encyclopedic knowledge, which allowed him to make abstruse academic subjects accessible and engaging. In a 1980 review of The Name of the Rose, literary critic and scholar Frank Kermode refers to Theory of Semiotics, as "a vigorous but difficult treatise", finding Eco's novel, "a wonderfully interesting book – a very odd thing to be born of a passion for the Middle Ages and for semiotics, and a very modern pleasure." Gilles Deleuze cites Eco's 1962 book The Open Work approvingly in his seminal 1968 text Difference and Repetition, a book which poststructuralist philosopher Jacques Derrida is said to have also taken inspiration from. In an obituary by the philosopher and literary critic Carlin Romano, meanwhile, Eco is described as having "[become], over time, the critical conscience at the center of Italian humanistic culture, uniting smaller worlds like no one before him."

In 2017, a retrospective of Eco's work was published by Open Court as the 35th volume in the prestigious Library of Living Philosophers, edited by Sara G. Beardsworth and Randall E. Auxier, featuring essays by 23 contemporary scholars.

== Honours ==
Following the publication of The Name of the Rose in 1980, Eco was awarded the Strega Prize in 1981, Italy's most prestigious literary award, receiving the Anghiari Prize the same year. The following year, he received the Mendicis Prize, and in 1985 the McLuhan Teleglobe Prize. In 2005, Eco was honoured with the Kenyon Review Award for Literary Achievement, along with Roger Angell. In 2010, Eco was invited to join the Accademia dei Lincei.

Eco was awarded honorary doctorate degrees for the first time by the KU Leuven, then by the University of Odense in 1986, Loyola University Chicago in 1987, the University of Liege in 1989, the University of Glasgow in 1990, the University of Kent in 1992, Indiana University Bloomington in 1992, University of Tartu in 1996, Rutgers University in 2002, and the University of Belgrade in 2009. Additionally, Eco was an honorary fellow of Kellogg College, Oxford and an associate member of the Royal Academy of Belgium.

In 2014 he was awarded the Gutenberg Prize of the International Gutenberg Society and the City of Mainz.

== Religious views ==
During his university studies, Eco ceased to believe in God and left the Catholic Church. He helped co-found the Italian skeptic organization Comitato Italiano per il Controllo delle Affermazioni sulle Pseudoscienze (Italian Committee for the Investigation of Claims of the Pseudosciences).

== Personal life and death ==
In September 1962 he married Renate Ramge, a German graphic designer and art teacher with whom he had a son and a daughter.

Eco divided his time between an apartment in Milan and a vacation house near Urbino. He had a 30,000-volume library in the former and a 20,000-volume library in the latter.

Eco died at his Milanese home of pancreatic cancer, from which he had been suffering for two years, on the night of 19 February 2016. From 2008 to the time of his death at the age of 84, he was a professor emeritus at the University of Bologna, where he had taught since 1971.

== In popular culture ==
- Eco has a cameo in Michelangelo Antonioni's 1961 film La Notte ('The Night'), playing a guest at a party celebrating the publication of protagonist Giovanni Pontano (Marcello Mastroianni)'s new book by Bompiani (where Eco was an editor in real life).
- Eco's private library collection was the subject of a 2023 documentary film by the director Davide Ferrario, the documentary was titled Umberto Eco: A Library of the World

== Selected bibliography ==
=== Novels ===
- Il nome della rosa (1980; English translation: The Name of the Rose, 1983)
- Il pendolo di Foucault (1988; English translation: Foucault's Pendulum, 1989)
- L'isola del giorno prima (1994; English translation: The Island of the Day Before, 1995)
- Baudolino (2000; English translation: Baudolino, 2001)
- La misteriosa fiamma della regina Loana (2004; English translation: The Mysterious Flame of Queen Loana, 2005)
- Il cimitero di Praga (2010; English translation: The Prague Cemetery, 2011)
- Numero zero (2015; English translation: Numero Zero, 2015)

=== Non-fiction books ===
- Il problema estetico in San Tommaso (1956 – English translation: The Aesthetics of Thomas Aquinas, 1988, revised)
- "Sviluppo dell'estetica medievale", in Momenti e problemi di storia dell'estetica (1959 – Art and Beauty in the Middle Ages, 1985)
- Opera aperta (1962, rev. 1976 – English translation: The Open Work, (1989)
- Diario Minimo (1963 – English translation: Misreadings, 1993)
- Apocalittici e integrati (1964 – Partial English translation: Apocalypse Postponed, 1994)
- Le poetiche di Joyce (1965 – English translations: The Middle Ages of James Joyce, The Aesthetics of Chaosmos, 1989)
- La Struttura Assente (1968 – The Absent Structure)
- Il costume di casa (1973 – English translation: Faith in Fakes: Travels in Hyperreality, 1986)
- Il segno (1973 – French enlarged adaptation of Jean-Marie Klinkenberg, Labor, 1988)
- Trattato di semiotica generale (1975 – English translation: A Theory of Semiotics, 1976)
- Il Superuomo di massa (1976)
- Come si fa una tesi di laurea (1977 – English translation: How to Write a Thesis, 2015)
- Dalla periferia dell'impero (1977)
- Lector in fabula (1979)
- A Semiotic Landscape. Panorama sémiotique. Proceedings of the 1st Congress of the International Association for Semiotic Studies (=Approaches to Semiotics, 29, Mouton 1979, with Seymour Chatman and Jean-Marie Klinkenberg).
- The Role of the Reader: Explorations in the Semiotics of Texts (1979, compilation of essays from Opera aperta, Apocalittici e integrati, Forme del contenuto (1971), Il Superuomo di massa, Lector in Fabula).
- Sette anni di desiderio (1983)
- Postille al nome della rosa (1983 – English translation: Postscript to The Name of the Rose, 1984)
- Semiotica e filosofia del linguaggio (1984 – English translation: Semiotics and the Philosophy of Language, 1984)
- De Bibliotheca (1986 – in Italian and French)
- Lo strano caso della Hanau 1609 (1989 – French translation: L'Enigme de l'Hanau 1609, 1990)
- I limiti dell'interpretazione (1990 – The Limits of Interpretation, 1990)
- Interpretation and Overinterpretation (1992, with R. Rorty, J. Culler, C. Brooke-Rose; edited by S. Collini)
- Il secondo diario minimo (1992)
- La ricerca della lingua perfetta nella cultura europea (1993 – English translation: The Search for the Perfect Language (The Making of Europe), 1995)
- Six Walks in the Fictional Woods (1994)
- Ur Fascism (1995 – English translation: Eternal Fascism, 1995); includes "14 General Properties of Fascism"
- Incontro – Encounter – Rencontre (1996 – in Italian, English, French)
- In cosa crede chi non crede? (1996 with Carlo Maria Martini – English translation: Belief or Nonbelief? A Dialogue, 2000)
- Cinque scritti morali (1997 – English translation: Five Moral Pieces, 2001)
- Kant e l'ornitorinco (1997 – English translation: Kant and the Platypus: Essays on Language and Cognition, 1999)
- Serendipities: Language and Lunacy (1998)
- How to Travel with a Salmon & Other Essays (1998 – Partial English translation of Il secondo diario minimo, 1994)
- La bustina di Minerva (1999)
- Experiences in Translation (University of Toronto Press, 2000)
- Sugli specchi e altri saggi (2002)
- Sulla letteratura (2003 – English translation by Martin McLaughlin: On Literature, 2004)
- Mouse or Rat?: Translation as Negotiation (2003)
- Storia della bellezza (2004, co-edited with Girolamo de Michele – English translation: History of Beauty/On Beauty, 2004)
- A passo di gambero. Guerre calde e populismo mediatico (Bompiani, 2006 – English translation by Alastair McEwen: Turning Back the Clock: Hot Wars and Media Populism, 2007)
- Storia della bruttezza (Bompiani, 2007 – English translation: On Ugliness, 2007)
- Dall'albero al labirinto: studi storici sul segno e l'interpretazione (Bompiani, 2007 – English translation by Anthony Oldcorn: From the Tree to the Labyrinth: Historical Studies on the Sign and Interpretation, 2014)
- La Vertigine della Lista (Rizzoli, 2009 – English translation: The Infinity of Lists)
- Costruire il nemico e altri scritti occasionali (Bompiani, 2011 – English translation by Richard Dixon: Inventing the Enemy, 2012)
- Storia delle terre e dei luoghi leggendari (Bompiani, 2013 – English translation by Alastair McEwen: The Book of Legendary Lands, 2013)
- Pape Satàn Aleppe: Cronache di una società liquida (Nave di Teseo, 2016 – English translation by Richard Dixon: Chronicles of a Liquid Society, 2017)
- Sulle spalle dei giganti (Collana I fari, Milano, La nave di Teseo, 2017, ISBN 978-88-934-4271-8 – English translation by Alastair McEwen: On the Shoulders of Giants, Harvard UP, 2019)

=== Anthologies ===
- Eco, Umberto; Sebeok, Thomas A., eds. (1984), The Sign of Three: Dupin, Holmes, Peirce, Bloomington, IN: History Workshop, Indiana University Press, ISBN 978-0-253-35235-4
- Ten essays on methods of abductive inference in Poe's Dupin, Doyle's Holmes, Peirce and many others, 236 pages.

=== Books for children ===
(Art by Eugenio Carmi)

- La bomba e il generale (1966, Rev. 1988 – English translation: The Bomb and the General Harcourt Children's Books (J); 1st edition (February 1989) ISBN 978-0-15-209700-4)
- I tre cosmonauti (1966 – English translation: The Three Cosmonauts Martin Secker & Warburg Ltd; First edition (3 April 1989) ISBN 978-0-436-14094-5)
- Gli gnomi di Gnu (1992 – English translation: The Gnomes of Gnu Bompiani; 1. ed edition (1992) ISBN 978-88-452-1885-9)
