= Faith in Fakes =

Essay by Umberto Eco

First edition (Bompiani, 1973)

Il costume di casa (Faith in Fakes) was originally an essay written by the Italian semiotician Umberto Eco, about "America's obsession with simulacra and counterfeit reality." It was later incorporated as the centrepiece of the anthology bearing the same name, a collection of articles and essays about Italian ideologies. The anthology contains a selection of essays taken from two Italian books by Eco: Il costume di casa (first published in 1973) and Sette anni di desiderio (1983). It was translated into English in 1986 as Faith in Fakes and later updated as Travels in Hyperreality in 1995.

== Content ==
The book is a collection of articles from mainly Italian newspapers and magazines about the wider subject of human consciousness, including Eco's own subject of semiotics. The subjects of the main essay includes modern Americana such as wax museums, Superman and holography, and the other articles discuss a number of other subjects, including football, the Middle Ages, Jim Jones and the People's Temple, and tight jeans.

=== Semiological guerrilla ===
The collection included the influential 1967 article Towards a Semiological Guerrilla Warfare, first given as a lecture at the conference Vision '67 in New York, and included in Eco's first work on semiotic theory, his 1968 La Struttura Assente (The Absent Structure).

The term has been influential in the theorization of guerrilla tactics against mainstream mass media culture, such as guerrilla television and culture jamming. Expressions used in the essay, "communications guerrilla warfare" and "cultural guerrilla," have been especially generative.
