= Serendipities =

Book by Umberto Eco

First edition (publ. Columbia University Press)

Serendipities: Language and Lunacy (originally published in English, translated by William Weaver) is a 1998 collection of essays by Umberto Eco. Dealing with the history of linguistics and Early Modern concepts of a perfect language, the material in the book overlaps with La ricerca della lingua perfetta.

== Chapters ==
1. The Force of Falsity
2. Languages in Paradise
3. From Marco Polo to Leibniz: Stories of Intellectual Misunderstandings
4. The Language of the Austral Land
5. The Linguistics of Joseph de Maistre

In chapter 1, based on a 1994 lecture held at Bologna University, Eco introduces his thesis about consequences of erroneous beliefs. Chapter 2 contains essentially the same material as chapters 1 and 3 of La ricerca della lingua perfetta, while chapter 3 is a reworking of its chapters 7 and 14(5). Chapters 4 and 5 have been published as essays in honor of Luigi Rosiello and deal with La Terre Australe connue by Gabriel de Foigny and Joseph de Maistre's views as exposed in his Soirees de Saint Petersbourg.

== Editions ==
- Columbia University Press, New York (1998 - trans. William Weaver) ISBN 0-231-11134-7.
- Phoenix, London (1998).
- Weidenfeld & Nicolson, London (1999).
- Harvest Books, Fort Washington, PA (1999) ISBN 0-15-600751-7.
