= Valentino Bompiani =

Italian publisher, writer and playwright

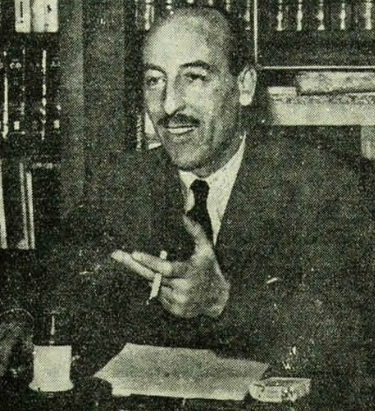
Valentino Bompiani

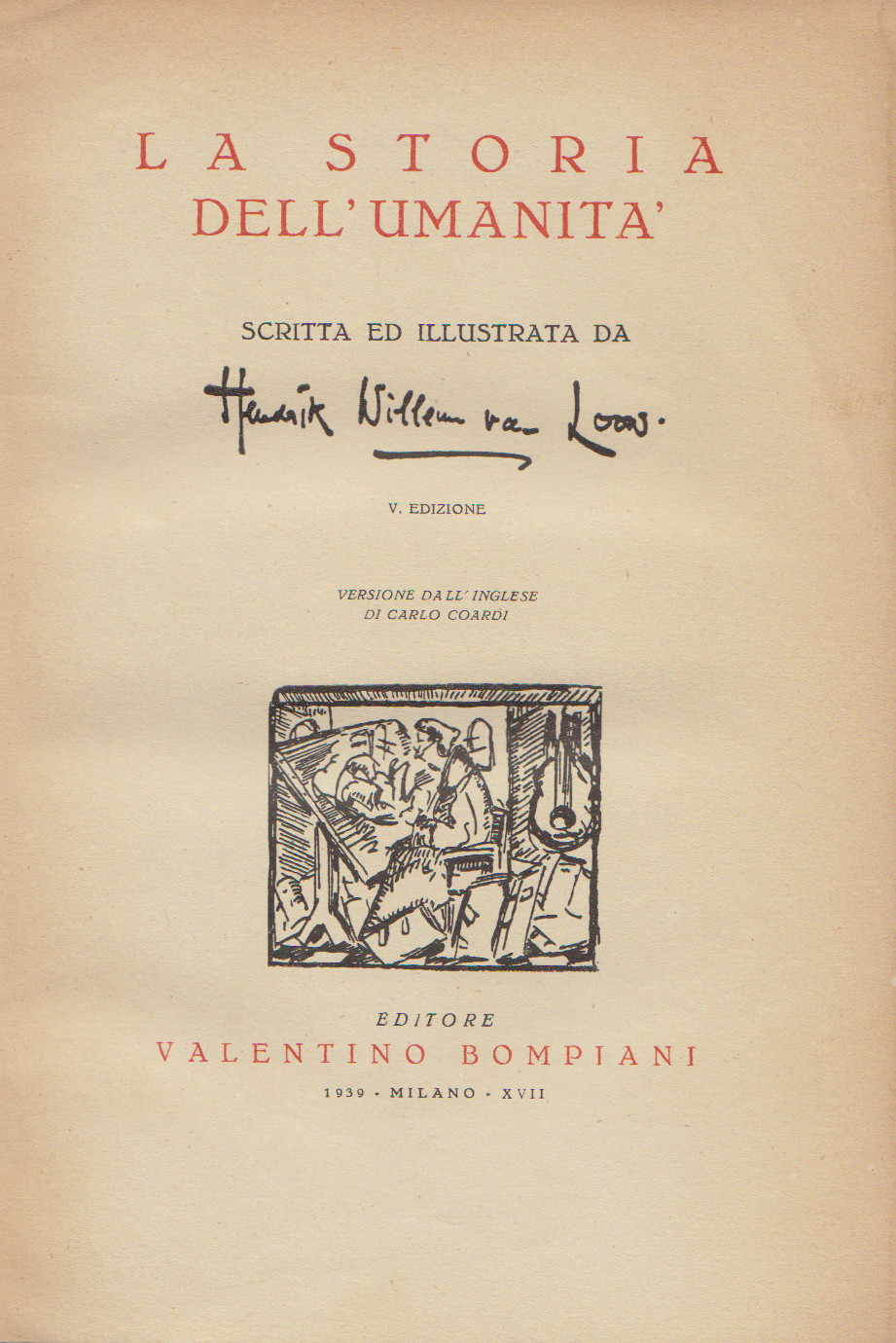
Frontispiece to Hendrik Willem Van Loon's translation of The Story of Mankind.

Valentino Silvio Bompiani (27 September 1898 – 23 February 1992) was an Italian publisher, writer and playwright.

Born in Ascoli Piceno (Marche), he entered the publishing world as a secretary working for Arnoldo Mondadori in 1922. He rose quickly and by 1928 had become the director of the Milanese publisher Unitas. In 1929 he founded the publishing house carrying his name, which became one of the most important in Italy. By 1992, Bompiani had published 17 Nobel Prize winners. It is currently part of RCS Libri.

He was involved in a number of censorship cases, one of which was related to Elio Vittorini's Americana (published in 1942), and was viewed as anti-Fascist, though he was willing to collaborate for financial reasons, unlike other publishers such as Editori Laterza and Giulio Einaudi Editore. In 1933, Mussolini acquired the rights to an Italian translation of Mein Kampf; after Arnoldo Mondadori Editore refused, Bompiani accepted the offer in July 1933. The book was translated by Jewish translator Angelo Treves.

He debuted as a playwright in 1931 with L’amante virtuosa. His masterwork is considered to be Albertina of 1945.

He also wrote about his activities as a publisher in Via privata (1971), Dialoghi a distanza (1986) and Il mestiere dell’editore (1988).

Bompiani, married to Mini Bregoli and with two daughters, died in Milan in 1992.
