= Foucault's Pendulum =

1988 Italian novel by Umberto Eco

- First edition (Italian)
- Author: Umberto Eco
- Original title: Il pendolo di Foucault
- Translator: William Weaver
- Language: Italian
- Genre: Postmodern literature; encyclopedic novel
- Publisher: Bompiani; Secker & Warburg (U.K.)
- Publication date: October 1988
- Publication place: Italy
- English publication date: 16 October 1989
- Media type: Print (Hardcover)
- Pages: 687 pp. (Italian); 641 pp. (English)
- ISBN: 88-452-1591-1 (Italian paperback) (Note: First edition was not assigned an ISBN. Bompiani's catalog number #178137 is printed on the dust jacket.); 0-436-14096-9 (U.K.)
- OCLC: 49337876

Foucault's Pendulum (original title: Il pendolo di Foucault [il ˈpɛndolo di fuˈko]) is a novel by Italian writer and philosopher Umberto Eco. It was first published in 1988, with an English translation by William Weaver being published a year later.

The book is divided into segments represented by the ten Sefiroth. It is satirical, being full of esoteric references to Kabbalah, alchemy, and conspiracy theories, to the point that critic and novelist Anthony Burgess suggested that it needed an index. The pendulum of the title refers to an actual pendulum designed by French physicist Léon Foucault to demonstrate Earth's rotation, which has symbolic significance within the novel. Some believe that it refers to Michel Foucault, (Note: The novel ends the day after Michel Foucault died (June 25, 1984).) given the author's friendship with him, but Eco "specifically rejects any intentional reference to Michel Foucault"—this being regarded as another subtle literary joke.

== Plot summary ==
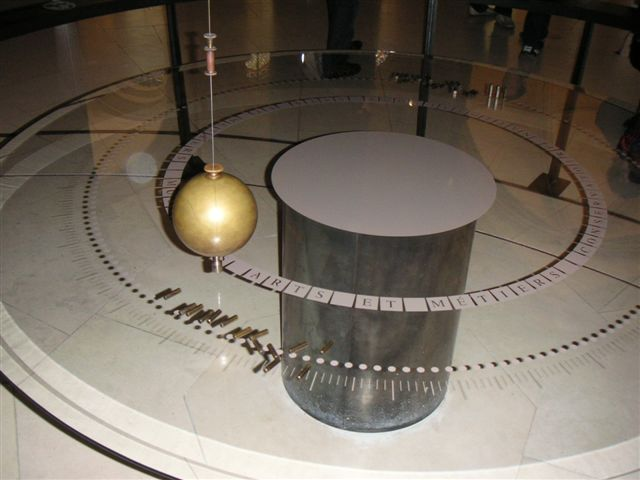
The eponymous Foucault pendulum at the Musée des Arts et Métiers in Paris.

The book opens with a man named Casaubon (Note: Casaubon's name refers to classical scholar Isaac Casaubon and also evokes a scholar character in George Eliot's Middlemarch.) hiding in the Musée des Arts et Métiers after closing. He believes that a secret society has kidnapped his friend Jacopo Belbo and is now after him, and that they will soon convene in the museum. As he waits, Casaubon reflects on his life, but it is implied that he is an unreliable narrator whose mind has been warped by conspiracy theories.

== Plot ==
In the 1970s in Milan, Casaubon, who as a student had participated in the 1968 Italian uprisings, is studying the Knights Templar for his thesis when he meets Belbo and his colleague Diotallevi. The former works as an editor in a publishing house and invites Casaubon to review a manuscript about the Templars. The manuscript, by Colonel Ardenti, claims he discovered a secret plan of the Templars to take over the world, basing it on a mysterious note written in an ancient code as the focus of the discovery. Ardenti mysteriously vanishes after meeting with Belbo and Casaubon; Casaubon then moves to Brazil to pursue a relationship with a woman named Amparo and meets Agliè, an elderly man who implies he is the mystical Comte de Saint-Germain. Casaubon's relationship with Amparo falls apart after attending an Umbanda rite due to her loss of personal control over herself during the rite, and he returns to Milan, where he is hired by Belbo's employer, Mr. Garamond, (Note: The novel's character "Mr. Garamond" is a reference to the Garamond typeface that was derived from one cut for the 15th century Venetian printer Aldus Manutius.) as a researcher. Casaubon learns that in addition to a respected publishing house, Garamond also owns Manutius, a vanity publisher that charges incompetent authors large sums to print their work and feed their egos in the process. (Note: The name of the fictional publishing house (Manuzio) is rendered Manutius in the English translation; it is a reference to the 15th century Venetian printer Aldus Manutius.) Garamond has the idea to begin two lines of occult books, one for serious publishing and the other to be published by Manutius to attract more vanity authors. Agliè, now also in Milan, becomes a consultant to Garamond. Belbo grows jealous of Agliè's ability to charm Belbo's former mistress Lorenza. Casaubon enters into a relationship with a woman named Lia, who nicknames him "Pow" to reflect the power of their intimate connection.

Belbo, Diotallevi, and Casaubon become submerged in occult manuscripts that draw flimsy connections between historical events, and soon have the idea to develop their own as a game. Using Belbo's personal computer "Abulafia" and Ardenti's manuscript as a foundation, the three create what they call "The Plan" using a program that rearranges pre-typed sentences at random to suggest ideas. The Plan eventually becomes an intricate web of conspiracy theories about the Templars and their goal to reshape the world using "telluric currents", whose focal point can be determined using the Foucault pendulum and a unique map. In addition to numerous other historical organizations apparently involved in The Plan, the three invent a fictional secret society, the Tres (Templi Resurgentes Equites Synarchici, Latin for "the Resurgent Synarchic Knights of the Temple").

As time passes, the three become increasingly obsessed with The Plan and wonder if it could be true. Casaubon talks to Lia, who now has a child with him, and shows her the note that the entire Plan is based upon to qualify their efforts. She analyzes it for a day and a night and reconstructs it - the note was encoded using a modern cipher, not an ancient one, and the note itself is actually a laundry list for a merchant. Casaubon, still invested in the Plan, suggests they elevated the note to the level of poetry, and Lia responds that they've created an all-encompassing lie that will fool many of the people it is meant for, calling it "hair oil" and a bad joke she doesn't like.

Diotallevi is diagnosed with cancer and attributes it to divine retribution for his role in The Plan. Belbo, overcome by jealousy over Lorenza, discusses The Plan with Agliè and claims to be in possession of the existence of a Templar map revealing the location of a "valve" that controls the telluric currents. Agliè demands to see it and is refused; Belbo "confesses" to burning the information but retaining the memory of it. Agliè, Garamond, Ardenti, and many of the manuscript authors convince themselves they are the Tres, and that Agliè is their leader; the latter then forces Belbo to accompany him to Paris using blackmail and kidnapping. Casaubon visits Belbo's apartment and reads his personal files, then goes to Paris and Foucault's Pendulum to rescue Belbo from Agliè and his associates.

In the present, a group led by Agliè gathers around the pendulum for an arcane ritual. Casaubon sees several ectoplasmic forms appear, one of which claims to be the real Comte de Saint-Germain and denounces Agliè in front of his followers. Belbo is questioned but refuses to reveal what he knows, inciting a riot during which he is hanged from the cable of Foucault's Pendulum. Casaubon escapes the museum and flees to the countryside villa where Belbo grew up, soon learning that Diotallevi succumbed to his cancer at midnight on St. John's Eve, coincidentally the same time Belbo died.

Casaubon meditates on events and resigns to being captured by the Tres, where he plans to follow Belbo's lead and tell them nothing - even expecting that his death at their hands will convince them that the Plan is real. While waiting in the villa, Casaubon finds an old manuscript by Belbo that relates a mystical experience he had when he was twelve, in which he perceived ultimate meaning beyond signs and semiotics. He realizes that much of Belbo's behavior, and possibly his creation of the Plan and even his death, was inspired by Belbo's desire to recapture that lost meaning. (Note: The mystical experience involved playing the trumpet. In 2008, Eco told an interviewer that he plays the trumpet every day, to recapture the feelings of his lost childhood.)

== Major themes ==
Most books written in this fiction genre focus on the mysterious, and provide their own versions of conspiracy theories. In contrast, Eco focuses on the historical mystery surrounding the Knights Templar. The novel may be viewed as a critique, spoof, or deconstruction of the grand overarching conspiracies often found in postmodern literature. The title might allude to one of postmodernism's key exponents, Michel Foucault, though Eco denied this.

The main plot details a conspiratorial "Plan", but the book focuses on the development of the characters. They slowly transition from skeptical editors, mocking the Manutius manuscripts, to credulous Diabolicals (their name for the occult enthusiasts they deal with) themselves. The conspiracy theory is therefore a plot device, not an earnest proposition.

Belbo's writings are a recurrent theme throughout the book. The entire book is narrated in the first person by Casaubon, with brief interludes from the files on Abulafia. These passages are often eccentrically written, and deal in most part with Belbo's childhood, his constant sense of failure, and his obsession with Lorenza. The interludes from his childhood serve as a stark contrast to the mythical world of cults and conspiracies. Belbo is extremely careful to not try to create (literature), because he deems himself unworthy, although it becomes somewhat obvious that writing is his passion. This attitude of constant subconscious self-abasement fits in with the overall irony focused on in the book, considering that Belbo is eventually consumed by (re)creation of the Plan; one excerpt meant for the unattainable Lorenza reads, "I could not possess you, but I can blow up history."

Casaubon is a scholar: While Belbo seeks inner peace, Casaubon's quest is of knowledge. The uncertainty of scientific knowledge and human experience is explored in his character, as he participates in various extra-natural events. His narratives abandon his strict realism and become increasingly inclined towards the supernatural as the novel progresses, despite periodic reality checks from his partner Lia.

Mr. Garamond, whose primary business is selling dreams (through his vanity press outlet), comes to believe the fantasy world his authors weave. It is possible, though, that he had always been a "Diabolical", and founded his publishing business to fish for information.

Eco shows that if one stops discriminating between whether propositions are right or wrong, it is possible to link any fact or idea with any other, but that this creates a dangerous tendency towards conspiracy theories.

As Diotallevi approaches death, he remarks: "I'm dying because I convinced myself that there was no order, that you could do whatever you liked with any text".

As Belbo approaches death, Casaubon remarks of him that: "... he refused to bow to nonmeaning. He somehow knew that fragile as our existence may be, however ineffectual our interrogation of the world, there is nevertheless something that has more meaning than the rest".

As Casaubon awaits death at the hands of those who incorrectly believe that he is withholding some occult information from them, he reflects that: "It makes no difference whether I write or not. They will look for other meanings, even in my silence".

Eco reinforces this theme by quoting Karl Popper at the heading of chapter 118: "The conspiracy theory of society ... comes from abandoning God and then asking: 'Who is in his place?'".

=== Societies in the novel ===
A wide variety of organizations are listed in Foucault's Pendulum, including the Assassins of Alamut, the Bavarian Illuminati, the Bogomils, the Candomblé, the Cathars, the fictional Cthulhu cult, the Church of Jesus Christ of Latter-day Saints (which in the novel Mr. Garamond includes in his list of "occult" organizations to contact about book ideas), the Elders of Zion, the Freemasons, the Gnostics, Gurdjieffians, the Jesuits, the Knights Templar, Opus Dei, Ordo Templi Orientis, Panta Rei, and the Rosicrucians.

== Comparison with other writings ==
Foucault's Pendulum (1988) has been called "the thinking man's Da Vinci Code". The parchment that sparks the Plan plays a role which is similar to the parchments in the Rennes-le-Château story in Brown's novel and in The Holy Blood and the Holy Grail (1982), from which Brown drew inspiration. Eco's novel predated the Da Vinci phenomenon by more than a decade, but both novels are concerned with the Knights Templar, complex conspiracies, secret codes, and even a chase around the monuments of Paris. Eco does so, however, from a much more critical perspective; Foucault is more a satire on the futility of conspiracy theories and those who believe them, rather than an attempt to proliferate such beliefs.

Eco was asked whether he had read the Brown novel; he replied:

I was obliged to read it because everybody was asking me about it. My answer is that Dan Brown is one of the characters in my novel Foucault's Pendulum, which is about people who start believing in occult stuff. ... But you yourself seem interested in the kabbalah, alchemy, and other occult practices explored in the novel. ... No. In Foucault's Pendulum I wrote the grotesque representation of these kind of people. So Dan Brown is one of my creatures.

Eco was indebted to Danilo Kiš's story "The Book of Kings and Fools" in The Encyclopedia of the Dead (1983) for the portrayal of Sergei Nilus. The Boston Globe claimed that "one can trace a lineage from Robert Anton Wilson's The Illuminatus! Trilogy to Umberto Eco's Foucault's Pendulum". The Illuminatus! Trilogy was written 13 years before Foucault's Pendulum. George Johnson wrote on the similarity of the two books that "both works were written tongue in cheek, with a high sense of irony." Both books are divided into ten segments represented by the ten Sefiroth.

Foucault's Pendulum also bears a number of similarities to Eco's own experiences and writing. The character of Belbo was brought up in the region of Piedmont in Northern Italy. Eco refers to his own visit to a Candomblé ceremony in Brazil in an article compiled in Faith in Fakes, reminiscent of the episode in the novel. He also describes French ethnologist Roger Bastide who bears a resemblance to the character of Agliè. Eco's novel was also a direct inspiration on Charles Cecil during the development of Revolution Software's highly successful point and click adventure game Broken Sword: The Shadow of the Templars, in which an American tourist and a French journalist must thwart a conspiracy by a shadowy cabal who model themselves on the Knights Templar.

Stanley Kubrick sought the rights to adapt Foucault's Pendulum into a film; however, Eco declined due to his dissatisfaction with the 1986 film adaptation of his earlier novel The Name of the Rose. Additionally, Eco sought the role of screenwriter but Kubrick was unwilling to cooperate. Following Kubrick's death, Eco stated that he regretted his initial decision.

== See also ==
- The Club Dumas
