= Ahmed Djebbar =

Algerian university teacher and mathematician

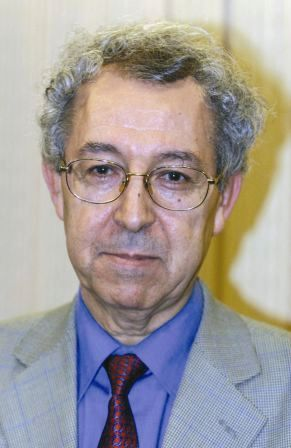
Ahmed Djebbar

Ahmed Djebbar (born 1941) is an academic and the Algerian minister for education in the 1992 government of Belaid Abdessalam.
