= Bompiani =

Italian publishing house

- Parent company: Giunti Editore
- Founded: 1929
- Founder: Valentino Bompiani
- Country of origin: Italy
- Headquarters location: Milan, Italy
- Publication types: Books
- Official website: www.bompiani.eu

Bompiani is an Italian publishing house based in Milan. It was founded in 1929 by Valentino Bompiani. In 1990, Bompiani became part of the RCS MediaGroup. It was sold in 2015 to the Giunti Group. It is widely regarded as one of the leading literary publishing houses in Italy.

== History ==
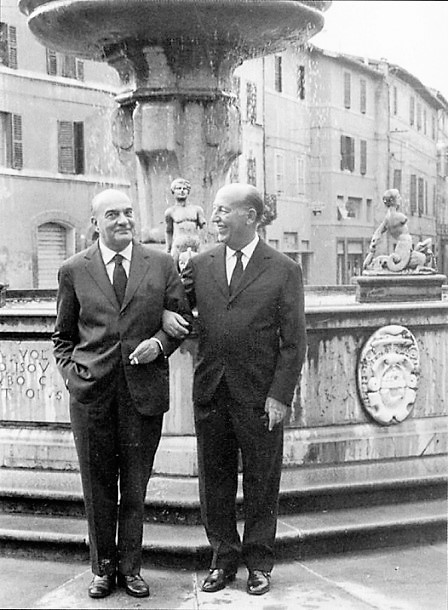
Libero Bigiaretti with the publisher Valentino Bompiani (right).

Bompiani experienced attempts at book censorship by Italy's fascist government from the 1920s through the 1940s. In 1940, Valentino Bompiani was summoned to Rome to meet with Alessandro Pavolini, the Minister of Popular Culture. At this meeting, Pavolini told Bompiani that he must limit the number of translations that he was publishing. At the time of the meeting, Bompiani was preparing to publish an anthology of American writers. Despite being told not to do so, Bompiani moved forward with the anthology. Pavolini learned of this and wrote to Bompiani that "The United States is a potential enemy of ours...This is no time to perform acts of courtesy toward America, not even literary ones." Bompiani proceeded with publication nonetheless, soliciting a new introduction from Emilio Cecchi that sought to discourage any "excessive enthusiasm" toward America. Pavolini was placated by Cecchi's introduction and the anthology was ultimately published.

In 1972 the company was bought by Fiat Group. In 1990 it became part of RCS MediaGroup. In October 2015, RCS MediaGroup sold RCS Libri, including Bompiani, to Arnoldo Mondadori Editore, Italy's largest publisher. Mondadori is owned by Fininvest, a holding company controlled by Silvio Berlusconi. The acquisition was controversial. In March 2016, Italian Competition Authority ruled that Mondadori must sell Bompiani in order to comply with market-share limits. Nine companies, including Amazon and HarperCollins, expressed interest in purchasing Bompiani. In September 2016, Bompiani was sold to Giunti Editore for €16.5 million.

== Authors ==
The list of authors published by Bompiani includes 18 Nobel Prize winners, the most recent being László Krasznahorkai. Authors published by Bompiani include Alberto Moravia, Umberto Eco, Paulo Coelho and Yuval Noah Harari among others.
