= Genome architecture mapping =

Term in molecular biology

In molecular biology, genome architecture mapping (GAM) is a cryosectioning method to map colocalized DNA regions in a ligation independent manner. It overcomes some limitations of Chromosome conformation capture (3C), as these methods have a reliance on digestion and ligation to capture interacting DNA segments. GAM is the first genome-wide method for capturing three-dimensional proximities between any number of genomic loci without ligation.

The sections that are found using the cryosectioning method mentioned above are referred to as nuclear profiles. The information that they provide relates to their coverage across a genome. A large set of values can be produced that represents the strength of nuclear profiles' presence within a genome. Based on how large or small the coverage across a genome is, judgements can be made involving chromatin interactions, nuclear profile location within the nucleus being cryosectioned, and chromatin compaction levels.

To be able to visualize this information, certain methods can be implemented using the raw data given by a table that shows whether or not nuclear profiles are detected in a genomic window, the genomic windows being represented within a certain chromosome. With a 1 representing a detection within a window and a 0 representing no detection, subsets of data can be obtained and interpreted by creating graphs, charts, heatmaps, and other visualization methods that allow these subsets to be seen in ways other than binary detection methods. By using a more graphic approach to interpreting the data obtained with cryosectioning, it is possible to see interactions that would have otherwise not been seen before.

Some examples of how these visuals can be interpreted include bar graphs that show the radial position and chromatin compaction levels of nuclear profiles, they can be split into categories to give a generalization of how often nuclear profiles are detected within a genomic window. A radar chart is a circular graph that represents the percentages of occurrence within a number of variables. In the sense of genomic information, radar charts can be used to show how genomic windows are represented within "features" of the genome that are part of certain regions that make it up. These charts can be made to compare groups of nuclear profiles with each other and their differences in how they occur within these features is shown graphically. Heatmaps are another form of visual representation where individual values in a table are shown by cells that take on different colors based on their value. This allows for trends to be seen within a table by the display of groups of similar colors or the lack of.

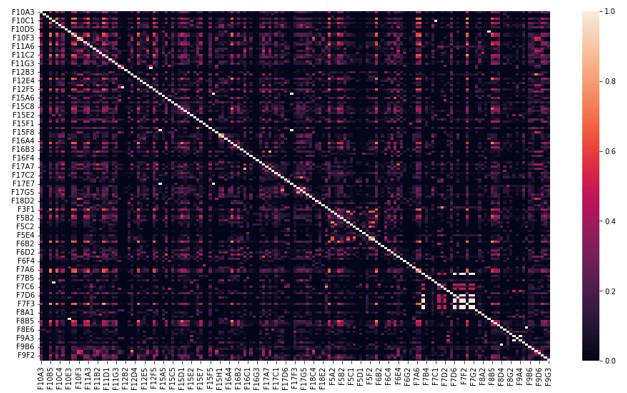
This heatmap displays the similarity between nuclear profiles using cells that take on values from 0 - 1

The heatmap to the right represents the relationship between nuclear profiles based on a calculated Jaccard Index where the values ranging from 0-1 are the degree of similarity between two nuclear profiles. Showing this similarity can help to display where certain groups of nuclear profiles are more common within a genome. In this heatmap the diagonal white line of cells is expected because these cells indicate where nuclear profiles intersect themselves and are therefore the most similar as possible to each other, which gives them a value of 1. In addition to the white diagonal line of cells, a cluster of other lightly colored cells can be observed in the bottom right of the heatmap. This grouping of nuclear profiles display high similarity using the Jaccard Index. This means that the nuclear profiles are present in a greater number of genomic windows than others.

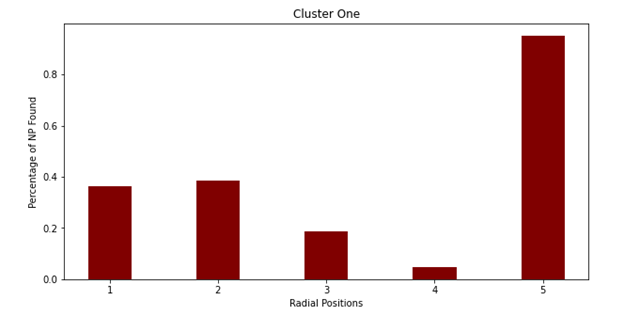
This bar graph shows how the radial positions of nuclear profiles are distributed across a cluster

The bar graph to the right represents the percentage of nuclear profiles that belong to a category of radial position (with 5 being strongly equatorial and 1 being strongly apical). The cluster of nuclear profiles was calculated based on their similarity to each other using a k-means clustering method. To begin the process, three nuclear profiles were chosen at random as the 'centers' of the cluster. After the centers were chosen at random, every other nuclear profile is assigned to a cluster based on its distance from each center using a calculated distance value. New centers were then chosen to better represent the cluster. This process was repeated until the centers at the start matched the centers at the end. When the cluster centers have not changed, it could be interpreted that this means proper clusters have been chosen. Within each of these clusters the nuclear profiles are then given a value from 1 to 5 based on their radial position and this data is fed into a bar graph to give a visualization.

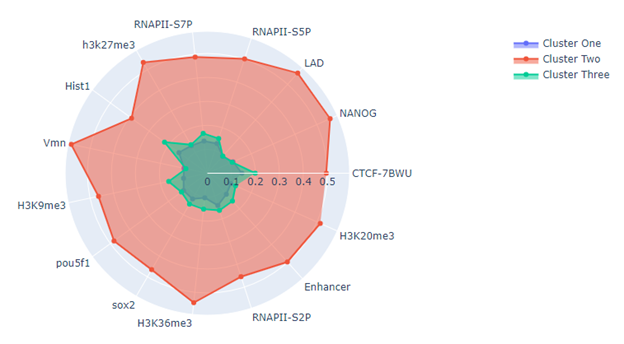
This is a radar chart that represents 3 cluster's presence in different features of the mouse genome

This radar chart to the right shows 3 clusters of nuclear profiles' percentage of occurrence within certain features of the mouse genome. Each cluster of nuclear profiles was calculated using the k-means clustering technique described above, relating to the bar graph showing radial positions of nuclear profiles. Comparisons can be made between the clusters and how they show up more or less in certain features in contrast to each other. To calculate a cluster's presence within a certain feature, it is determined if a nuclear profile is present within a window that is detected within a feature. The percentage of how often nuclear profiles within a cluster occur within the same windows that are detected within a feature are then displayed by the radar chart.

== Cryosection and laser microdissection ==
Cryosections are produced according to the Tokuyasu method, involving stringent fixation to preserve nuclear and cellular architecture, cryoprotection with a sucrose-PBS solution, before freezing in liquid nitrogen. In Genome Architecture Mapping, sectioning is a necessary step for exploring the 3D topology of the genome, before Laser Microdissection. Then laser microdissection can isolate each nuclear profile, before DNA extraction and sequencing.

== Data analysis - bioinformatic tools ==
=== GAMtools ===
GAMtools is a collection of software utilities for Genome Architecture Mapping data developed by Robert Beagrie. Bowtie2 is required before running GAMtools. The input required for this program is in Fastq format. This software has a variety of features and the exact commands to use will depend on what you want to do with it, however most features require generating segregation table, so for most users the first steps to take will be to download or create input data, and perform the sequence mapping. This will generate a segregation table, which can then be used to perform various other operations which are outlined below. For further information, view the GAMtools documentation.

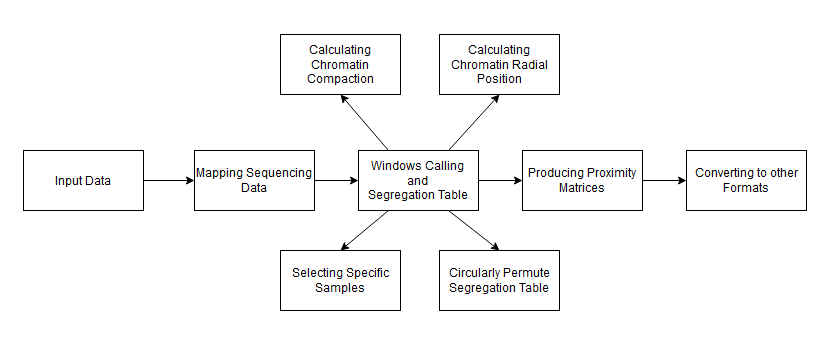
Flowchart

==== Mapping the sequencing data ====
The GAMtools command process_nps can be used to perform the mapping. It maps the raw sequence data from the nuclear profiles. GAMtools also provides the option to perform quality control checks on the NPs. This option can be enabled by adding the flag -c/--do-qc to the previous command. When the quality control check is enabled, GAMtools will try to exclude poor quality nuclear profiles.

The GAMtools command gamtools process_nps is used to map raw sequence data from nuclear profiles (NPs) and generate a segregation table. Quality control can be enabled with the -c or --do-qc flag to exclude low-quality NPs.

The GAMtools command for this step is:

gamtools process_nps --do-qc -g <GENOME_FILE> <FASTQ_FILE> [<FASTQ_FILE> ...]

==== Windows calling and segregation table ====
After mapping, GAMtools counts the number of reads from each nuclear profile that overlap with genomic windows, using a default window size of 50 kb. This step is performed by the same process_nps command and results in the generation of a segregation table, which indicates the presence or absence of each window across all profiles.

==== Producing proximity matrices ====
The GAMtools command for this process is matrix. The input file is the segregation table that was calculated from the windows calling step. GAMtools calculates these matrices using the normalized linkage disequilibrium, which means that it looks at how many times each pair of windows are detected by the same NP, and then normalizes the results based on how many times each window was detected across all NPs. The figure below shows an example of a proximity matrix heatmap produced using GAMtools.

The GAMtools command for this step is:

gamtools matrix [OPTIONS] -s <SEGREGATION_FILE> -r <REGION> [<REGION> ...]

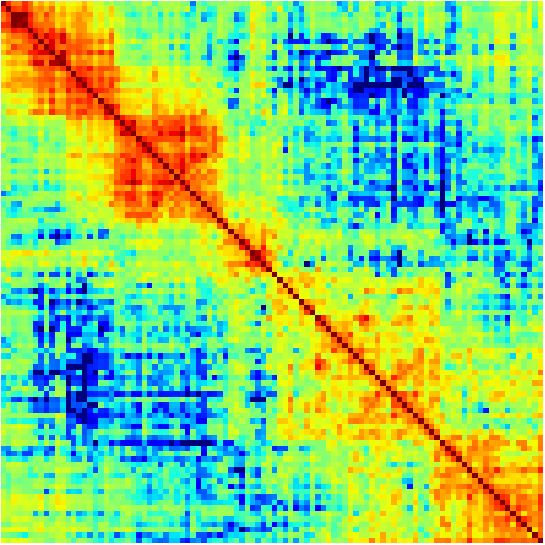
An example of a proximity matrix produced with GAMtools.

==== Calculating chromatin compaction ====
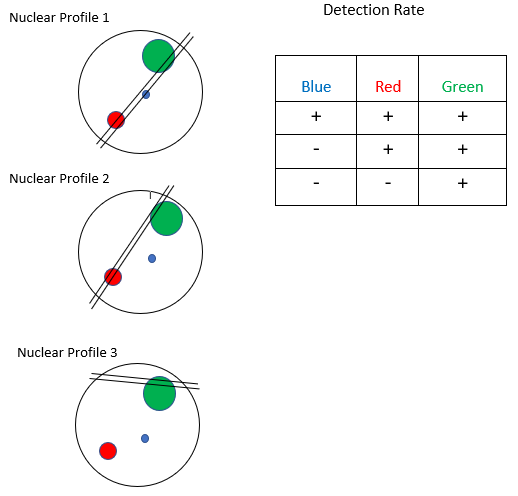
How genomic compaction and radial position affect detection frequency

The GAMtools command compaction can be used to calculate an estimation of chromatin compaction. Compaction is a value assigned to a gene that represents how large the gene is. The level of compaction is inversely proportional to the locus volume. Genomic loci with a low volume are said to have a high level of compaction, and loci with a high volume have a low level of compaction. As shown in the figure, loci with a low compaction level are expected to be intersected more often by the cryosection slices. GAMtools uses this information to assign a compaction value to each locus based on its detection frequency across many nuclear profiles. The compaction rate of these loci is not static, and will continually change throughout the life of the cell. Genomic loci are thought to be de-compacted when that gene is active. This allows a researcher to make assumptions about which genes are currently active in a cell, using the results of the GAMtools data. A locus with low compaction is also thought to be related to transcriptional activity. The time-complexity of the compaction command is O(m × n), where m is the number of genomic windows, and n is the number of nuclear profiles.

The GAMtools command for this step is:

gamtools compaction [OPTIONS] -s <SEGREGATION_FILE> -o <OUTPUT_FILE>

==== Calculating radial position ====
GAMtools can be used to calculate the radial position of NPs. The radial position of an NP is a measure of how near or far that NP is from the equator or center of the nucleus. NPs that are close to the center of the nucleus are considered equatorial whereas NPs that are closer to the edge of the nucleus are considered apical. The GAMtools command to calculate radial positioning is radial_pos. This requires that you have previously generated a segregation table. The radial position is estimated from the average size of NPs that contain a given chromatin region. Chromatin that are closer to the periphery will typically be intersected by smaller, more apical NPs, whereas central chromatin will be intersected by larger, equatorial NPs.

In order to estimate the size of each NP, GAMtools looks at the number of windows each NP saw, as NPs that saw more windows can be assumed to be larger in volume. This is very similar to the method used to estimate chromatin compaction. The figure to the right illustrates how GAMtools looks at each NP's detection rate to estimate the volume, in order to determine the compaction or the radial position. If we look at the first NP, we see that it intersects all three windows, so we can estimate that it is one of the largest NPs. The second NP intersects two out of the three windows, so we can estimate that it is smaller than the first NP. The third NP only intersects one out of the three windows, so we can estimate that it is the smallest NP. Now that we have an estimation of the size of each NP, we can estimate the radial position. If we assume that the larger NPs are more equatorial, then we find that the first NP is the most equatorial, the second NP is the second most equatorial, and the third NP is the most apical.

The GAMtools command for this step is:

gamtools radial_pos [OPTIONS] -s <SEGREGATION_FILE> -o <OUTPUT_FILE>

Here is some pseudocode that illustrates how one might calculate the radial position of a list of NPs:

// Suppose we have a 2D matrix called data where the rows correspond to the NPs and the columns correspond to the windows, so if data[1][2] is 1, then that means NP 1 contains window 2
// Use this variable to keep track of the largest number of windows detected by a single NP
LET MAXWINDOW = 0
// Use this array to keep track of the number of windows detected by each NP, so we can later determine the radial position
LET RADIAL_POS = []

// Loop through all NPs
FOR NP FROM 1 TO NUM_NPS:
    LET WINCOUNT = 0

    // Count the number of windows each NP saw
    FOR WIN FROM 1 to NUM_WINDOWS:
        IF ( data[NP][WIN] == 1 )
            WINCOUNT = WINCOUNT + 1

    // See if the current NP has seen the most windows
    IF WINCOUNT > MAXWINDOW:
        MAXWINDOW = WINCOUNT

    // Add the count for the current NP to the array
    RADIAL_POS.APPEND( WINCOUNT )

// Divide the number of windows each NP saw by the largest number of windows any NP saw to get an estimate of the radial position
FOR NP FROM 1 TO NUM_NPS:
    RADIAL_POS[NP] = RADIAL_POS[NP] / MAXWINDOW

This pseudocode will create a list of radial positions that range from 0 - 1 that provide an estimation of the radial position, where 1 is the most equatorial and 0 is the most apical. The time complexity of this pseudocode is O( n * m ), where n is the number of NPs and m is the number of windows. The first for loop goes through n iterations, and it has an inner for loop which goes through m iterations, which means the time complexity of that for loop is O( n * m ). The second for loop has n iterations, so it has time complexity O( n ). Therefore, the overall time complexity of this code is O( n * m + n ), which can be reduced to O( n * m ).

== Data analysis methods ==
=== Overview ===
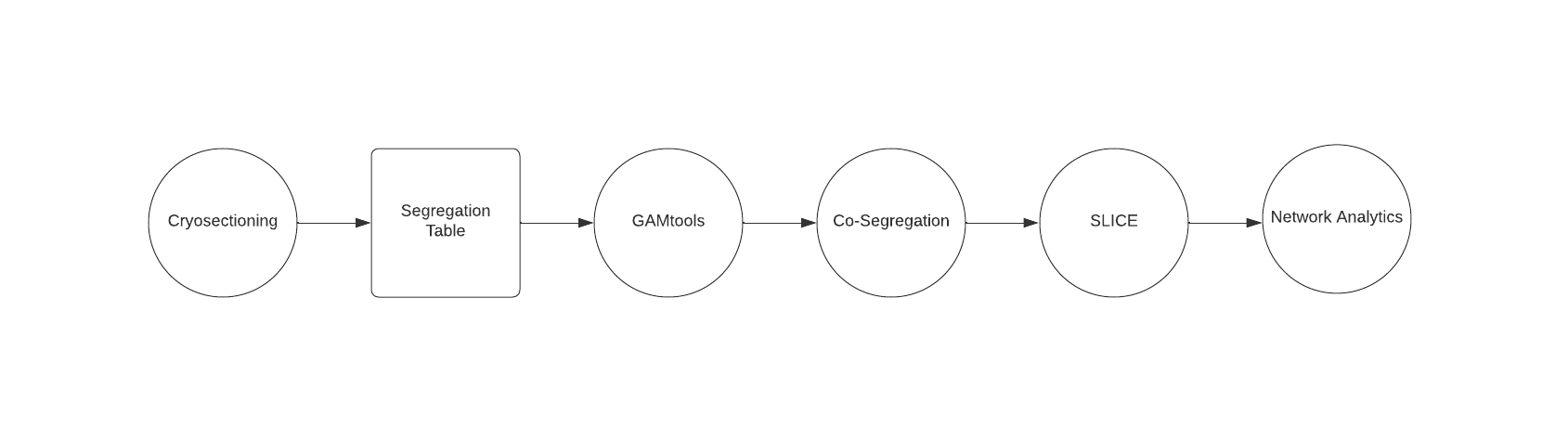
flowchart showing a general process of GAM data analysis. Circles represent a process and squares represent data.

The above flowchart shows a general process of how data may be derived from GAM analysis. Circles represent processes that may be performed, and squares represent pieces of data.

The first step of GAM analysis is the cryosectioning and examination of cells. This process results in a collection of nucleus slices (nuclear profiles) which contain pieces of DNA (genomic windows). These nuclear profiles are then examined so that a segregation table may be formed. Segregation tables are the foundation of GAM analysis. They contain information detailing which genomic loci appear within each nuclear profile.

An example of data analysis not given below would be clustering. For example, nuclear profiles that contain similar genomic loci could be clustered together by k-means clustering or some variation. K-means would work well for this particular problem in the sense that it would cluster every nuclear profile according to a similarity measure, but it also has drawbacks. The time complexity of K-means clustering is O(tknd), where t is the number of iterations, k is the number of means, n is the number of data points, and d is the number of dimensions for each data point. Such a complexity makes it NP-hard. As such, it does not scale well to large data sets and is more suited to subsets of data.

For further analysis, GAMtools may be used. GAMtools is a suite of software tools which can be used to extrapolate data from the segregation table, some of the results of which will be discussed below.

Cosegregation, or linkage, can be determined by observing how often two genomic loci appear together in the same nuclear profile. This data can show which loci are physically close to each other in 3D space, and which loci interact with each other regularly, which can help explain DNA transcription.

SLICE is a method of predicting specific interactions among genomic loci. It uses statistical data derived from cosegregation data.

Finally, graph analysis can be applied to the segregation table to locate communities. Communities can be defined several ways, such as by cliques, but in this article, community analysis will be focused on centrality. Centrality-based communities can be thought of as analogous to celebrities and their fan bases on a social media network. The fans may not interact with each other very much, but they do interact with the celebrity, who is the "center."

There are several different types of centrality, including but not limited to degree centrality, eigenvector centrality, and betweenness centrality, which may all result in different communities being defined. Something of note is that in our social network analogy above, an eigenvector centrality may not be accurate because one person who follows many celebrities may not have any influence over them. In that case, the graph may be seen as directed. In GAM analysis, it is generally assumed that the graph is undirected, so that if eigenvector centrality were to be used it would be accurate. Both clique and centrality calculations are computationally complex. Similar to the clustering mentioned above, they do not scale well to large problems.

=== SLICE ===
SLICE (StatisticaL Inference of Co-sEgregation) plays a key role in GAM data analysis. It was developed in the laboratory of Mario Nicodemi to provide a math model to identify the most specific interactions among loci from GAM cosegregation data. It estimates the proportion of specific interaction for each pair loci at a given time. It is a kind of likelihood method. The first step of SLICE is to provide a function of the expected proportion of GAM nuclear profiles. Then find the best probability result to explain the experimental data.

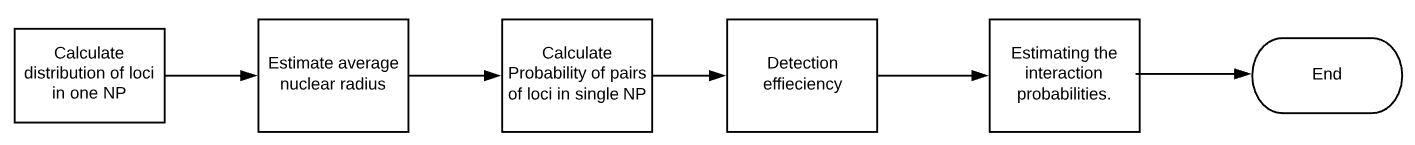
Flow chart of SLICE

==== SLICE model ====
The SLICE Model is based on a hypothesis that the probability of non-interacting loci falls into the same nuclear profile is predictable. The probability is dependent on the distance of these loci. The SLICE Model considers a pair of loci as two types: one is interacting, the other is non-interacting. As per the hypothesis, the proportions of nuclear profiles state can be predicted by mathematical analysis. By deriving a function of the interaction probability, these GAM data can also be used to find prominent interactions and explore the sensitivity of GAM.

==== Calculate distribution in a single nuclear profile ====
SLICE considers a pair of loci can be interaction or non-interaction across the cell population. The first step of this calculation is to describe a single locus. A pair of loci, A and B, can have two possible states: one is that A and B have no interactions with each other. The other is that they have. The first problem is that whether a single locus can be found in a nuclear profile.

The mathematical expression is:

Single locus probability: $v_0,v_1$
- <$v_1$> probability that the locus is found in a nuclear profile.
- <$v_0$>$=1-$<$v_1$> probability that the locus is not found in a nuclear profile.
- <$v_1$>=$V_{NP}/V_{nucleus}$

==== Estimation of average nuclear radius ====
As the equation above, the volume of the nuclear is a necessary value for calculation. The radii of these nuclear profiles can be used to estimate the nuclear radius. The SLICE prediction for radius matches Monte Carlo simulations(more detail about this step will be updated after get the license of the figure in the original author's paper.). With the result of the estimated radius, the probability of two loci in a non-interacting state and the probability of these two loci in an interacting state can be estimated.

Here is the mathematical expression of non-interacting:

<$u_i$>,i = 0, 1, 2 represents: find 0, 1 or 2 loci of a pair of non-interacting loci.
Two loci in a non-interacting state:$u_i$
$<u_0>=<v_0^2>,<u_1>=<v_1v_0>,<u_2>=<v_1^2>$
Here is the mathematical expression of interacting:
Estimation of two loci interaction state: $t_i$ probability
$<t_2>$~$<v_1>$, $<t_1>$~0, $<t_0>$~$<v_0>=1-<v_1>$

==== Calculate probability of pairs of loci in single nuclear profile ====
With the results of previous processes, the occurrence probability of a pair of loci in one nuclear profile can be calculated by statistics method. A pair of loci can exist in three different states. Each of them has a probability of $P_i,i = 0, 1, 2$
Occurrence probability of pairs of loci in single nuclear profiles:$P_2,P_1,P_0$
$P_2$: probability of two pairs of loci are in a state of interaction;
$P_1$: probability of one interacts the other, but the other does not interact;
$P_0$: probability of the two not interact.
SLICE Statistical Analysis
$N_{0,0}/N=<t_0^2>P_2+<t_0u_0>P_1+<u_0^2>P_0$
$N_{2,0}/N=N_{0,2}=<t_1^2>P_2+<t_1u_1>P_1+<u_1^2>P_0$
$N_{i,j}$ represent: number i is for A. Number j is for B.(i and j are equal to 0, 1 or 2 loci).

==== Detection efficiency ====
In Genome Architecture Mapping (GAM), detection efficiency refers to how likely it is that a genomic locus will be observed within a nuclear profile (NP). This likelihood depends on several factors, including the geometry of the nucleus and the degree of chromatin compaction. Genomic regions that are located near the nuclear periphery or are highly condensed are less likely to be intersected by the randomly oriented slices used in GAM. In contrast, loci that are more centrally positioned or exist in a decondensed state are more easily detected. Since not all loci present in a nuclear slice are reliably observed, the SLICE (Statistical Inference of Co-segregation) model incorporates detection efficiency to account for limitations such as incomplete slicing or DNA loss. This helps distinguish between a true absence of a signal and a failure to detect it.

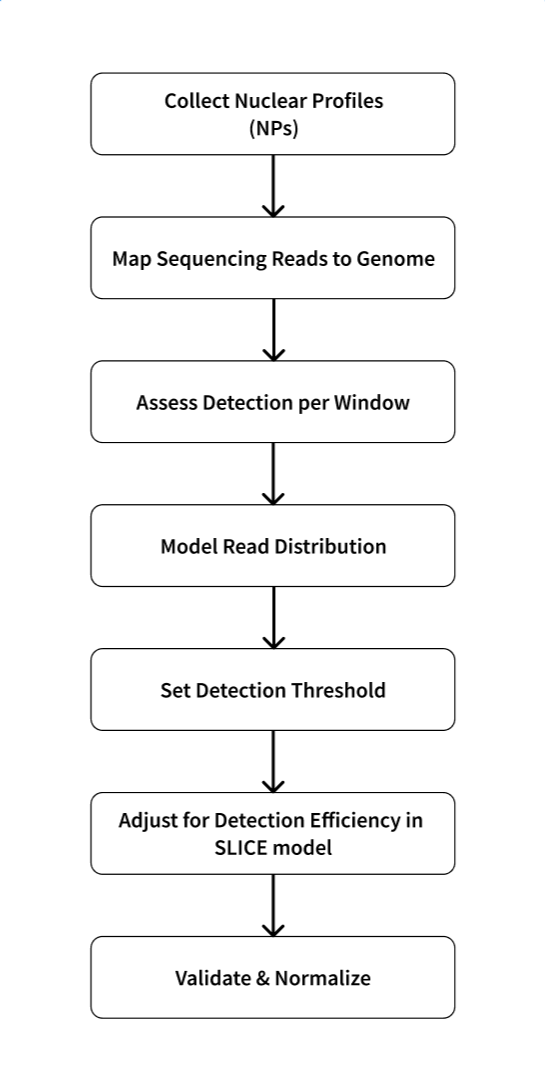
Flowchart illustrating detection efficiency implementation in Genome Architecture Mapping (GAM).

To assess detection efficiency, researchers studying mouse embryonic stem cells (mESCs) generated genome-wide contact maps from over 400 high-quality nuclear profiles. These studies examined detection at various resolutions, such as 30 kb, and found that approximately 400,000 uniquely mapped reads per NP were required to detect more than 80% of the positive windows. On average, each NP captured about 6 to 4% of the genome, aligning with expectations based on nuclear volume. Validation with FISH (fluorescence in situ hybridization) confirmed that regions as small as 40 kb could be effectively detected. To improve accuracy, statistical normalization was applied to reduce biases caused by factors like GC content, mappability, and variability in detection rates, producing GAM matrices with fewer artifacts than traditional Hi-C data.

To determine which genomic windows truly represent signals, sequencing reads were aggregated across windows ranging in size from 10 kb to 1 Mb. Researchers then modeled the read counts per NP using a mix of negative binomial and lognormal distributions. Based on this modeling, a threshold was set for each NP: windows were labeled as positive if the number of mapped reads significantly exceeded what would be expected due to sequencing noise alone. This combination of statistical rigor and correction for detection efficiency within the SLICE framework provides more accurate and biologically meaningful interpretations of GAM data.

Figure 3 in the original publication illustrates this modeling of detection efficiency and co-segregation frequency among genomic windows.

==== Estimating interaction probabilities of pairs ====
Based on the detection efficiency and the previously defined probabilities $u_0$, $u_1$, and $u_2$, SLICE estimates the likelihood that a pair of genomic loci are interacting. These values represent the probabilities of detecting zero, one, or both loci in a nuclear profile when the loci are not interacting:

$u_0 = v_0^2$: probability that neither locus is detected

$u_1 = 2v_1v_0$: probability that only one locus is detected

$u_2 = v_1^2$: probability that both loci are detected

By comparing these expected probabilities under the non-interacting model to observed co-segregation data, SLICE infers the interaction probability of each locus pair. The statistical inference accounts for detection efficiency and allows researchers to distinguish true chromatin contacts from coincidental co-detections due to nuclear slicing.

=== Co-segregation and normalized linkage ===
When mapping a genome, you can look at the co-segregation across different genomic windows and Nuclear Profiles (NPs) of a genome. Taking slices and samples of tissues derives nuclear profiles, and the ranges of windows found within a genome. Co-segregation in this instance is identifying the linkage between specified windows in a genome, as well as linkage disequilibrium and normalized linkage disequilibrium. One of the steps in calculating the co-segregation and linkage is finding each window's detection frequency. The detection frequency is the number of NPs present in the specified window divided by the total number of NPs. Each of the values calculated identify important differences and statistics for analyzing a genome. Normalized linkage disequilibrium is the final calculation which determines the real linkage between genomic windows. Once each of the values are calculated each result is used to calculate the normalized linkage equilibrium for each specified window in a genome. The normalized linkage value can be between 1.0 and -1.0, with 1.0 meaning the linkage between the two is high, and below 1.0 the linkage gets lower. Combining each windows normalized linkage value into a chart or matrix allows for the genome to be mapped and analyzed using a heatmap or another graph. The co-segregation and normalized linkage values can also be used for further calculations and analysis such as centrality and community detection which is discussed in the next section.

In order to find the co-segregation and linkages of windows, the following calculations must be completed: Detection frequency, co-segregation, linkage, and normalized linkage.

==== Calculating linkage and frequencies ====
Each calculation step discussed above is displayed and explained in the table below.

Formulas and Steps for Calculating Co-segregation and Linkage
Calculations	Formulas	Explanation
Detection Frequency	$\left ( \frac{A}{N} \right )$ or $fa$	Given a specified genomic window in a genome that contains 163 Nuclear Profiles, the formula to the left would be broken down as follows. A = the number of nuclear profiles present in the genomic window. N = 163, the total number of nuclear profiles. To calculate the detection frequency, simply divide the two.
Co-segregation	$\left ( \frac{AB}{N} \right )$ or $fab$	Given two specified genomic windows in a genome that contains 163 Nuclear Profiles, the formula to the left would be broken down as follows. AB = the number of nuclear profiles present in both genomic windows. N = 163, the total number of nuclear profiles. To calculate co-segregation, simply divide the two.
Linkage	$\left ( \frac{AB}{N} \right )-(\left ( \frac{A}{N} \right )*\left ( \frac{B}{N} \right ))$	Given two specified genomic windows in a genome that contains 163 Nuclear Profiles, the formula to the left would be broken down as follows. The first set of parenthesis calculates the co-segregation of the two windows as shown in the row above. The second set of parenthesis multiplies the detection frequency of the first window by the detection frequency of the second window. To summarize, calculate the co-segregation of the windows and subtract the product of the window's detection frequencies.
Normalized Linkage (NL)	If Linkage is less than 0: $LM = min(fa*fb, (1-fa)*(1-fb))$ $NL = \left ( \frac{Linkage}{LM} \right )$If Linkage is greater than 0: $LM = min(fb*(1-fa), fa*(1-fb))$ $NL = \left ( \frac{Linkage}{LM} \right )$	Given two specified genomic windows in a genome that contains 163 Nuclear Profiles, the formula to the left would be broken down as follows. If the Linkage value calculated in the previous step is less than 0, compare the two values in the parenthesis to find the minimum which is the Linkage Max: the product of the detection frequencies of the two windows and the product of one minus the detection frequency of each window. If the Linkage value calculated in the previous step is greater than 0, compare the two values in the parenthesis to find the minimum which is the Linkage Max: the product of the detection frequency of one window time one minus the detection frequency of the other and then the same calculation with the windows reversed. To summarize, calculate the products and inverses of the window's individual detection frequencies.

==== Displaying normalized linkage ====
Once the preceding calculation steps are completed, the normalized linkage values are assembled into a symmetric matrix. For a specified set of 81 genomic windows, this results in an 81 by 81 matrix. This dimension arises because each window is compared to itself and to every other window to compute the complete set of normalized linkage values. As each pair's linkage is calculated, the value is inserted into its corresponding row and column. For example, the linkage value between the first and second windows is placed at the intersection of the first column and the second row, as well as the second column and the first row. To facilitate interpretation, this matrix is commonly visualized as a two-dimensional heatmap, as shown below.

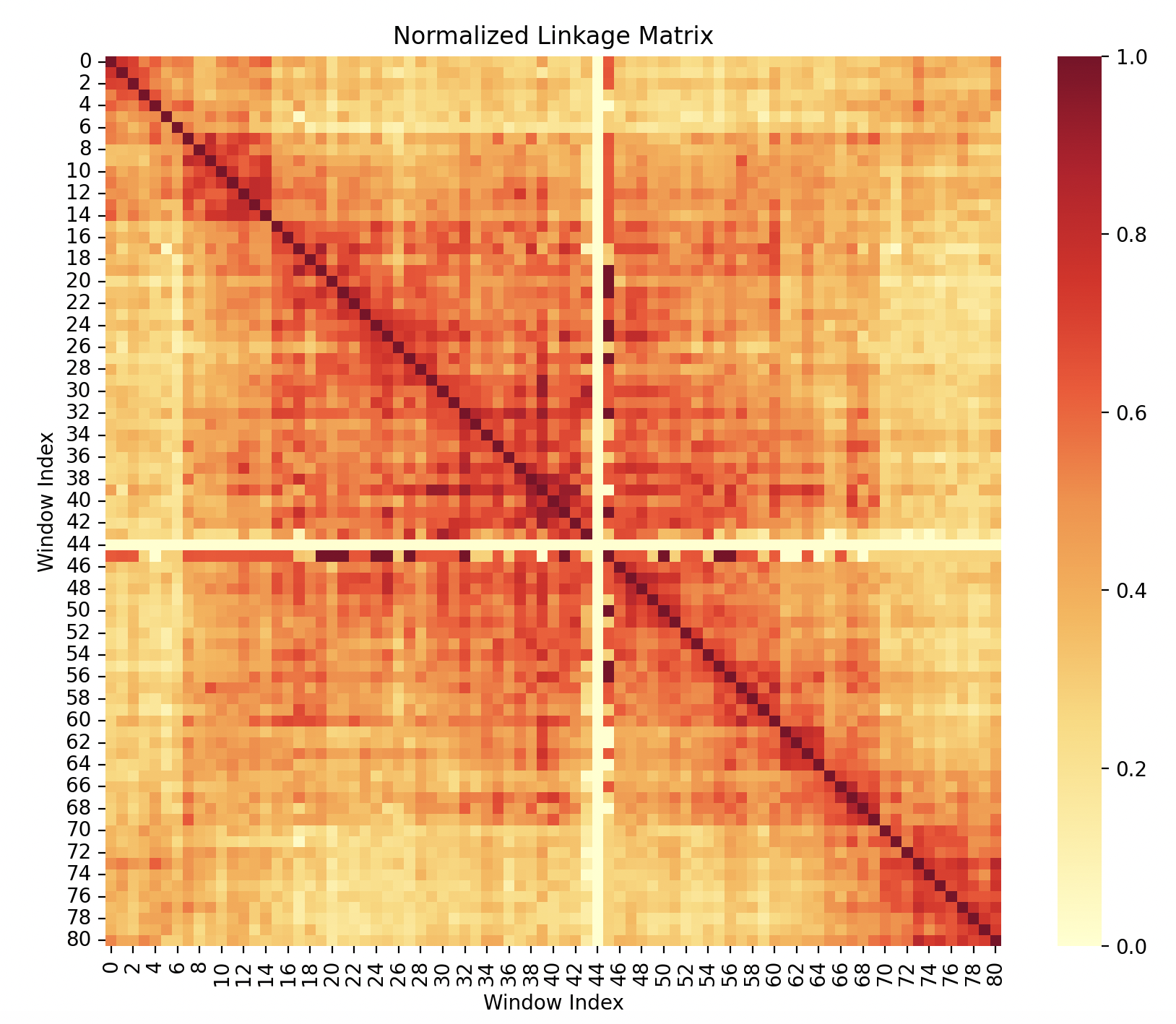
A heatmap visualization of a symmetric normalized linkage matrix. The diagonal axis (dark red) represents the self-linkage of genomic windows at the highest intensity, while the off-diagonal areas illustrate the strength of cosegregation and physical proximity between different windows. Blank white bands indicate regions where data was filtered or unmappable.

When analyzing the generated heatmap, the color intensity of each block indicates the strength of the linkage. In the example heatmap, the legend shows that the maximum linkage value of 1.0 corresponds to dark red. These highest values appear prominently along the diagonal line, representing the self-interaction where each genomic window is compared against itself. The off-diagonal entries, which transition from light yellow (indicating low linkage) to darker shades of orange and red, illustrate the probability of cosegregation and physical proximity between distinct windows. Additionally, the blank, light bands intersecting near the center of the map (around window 44) indicate regions where data was filtered or unmappable. Visualizing the normalized linkage matrix as a heatmap provides a clear foundation for analyzing chromosomal contacts, allowing the data to be used for further advanced 3D architectural modeling.

=== Graph analysis approach ===
Graph analysis can be used to identify related subsets, or "communities", of genomic windows after pairwise relationships have been summarized in a normalized linkage matrix.

==== Constructing a graph from normalized linkage data ====
Once pairwise relationships between genomic windows have been summarized in a normalized linkage matrix, the matrix can be converted into a graph representation. Each genomic window is treated as a node, and an undirected edge is added between two windows when their normalized linkage exceeds a selected threshold.

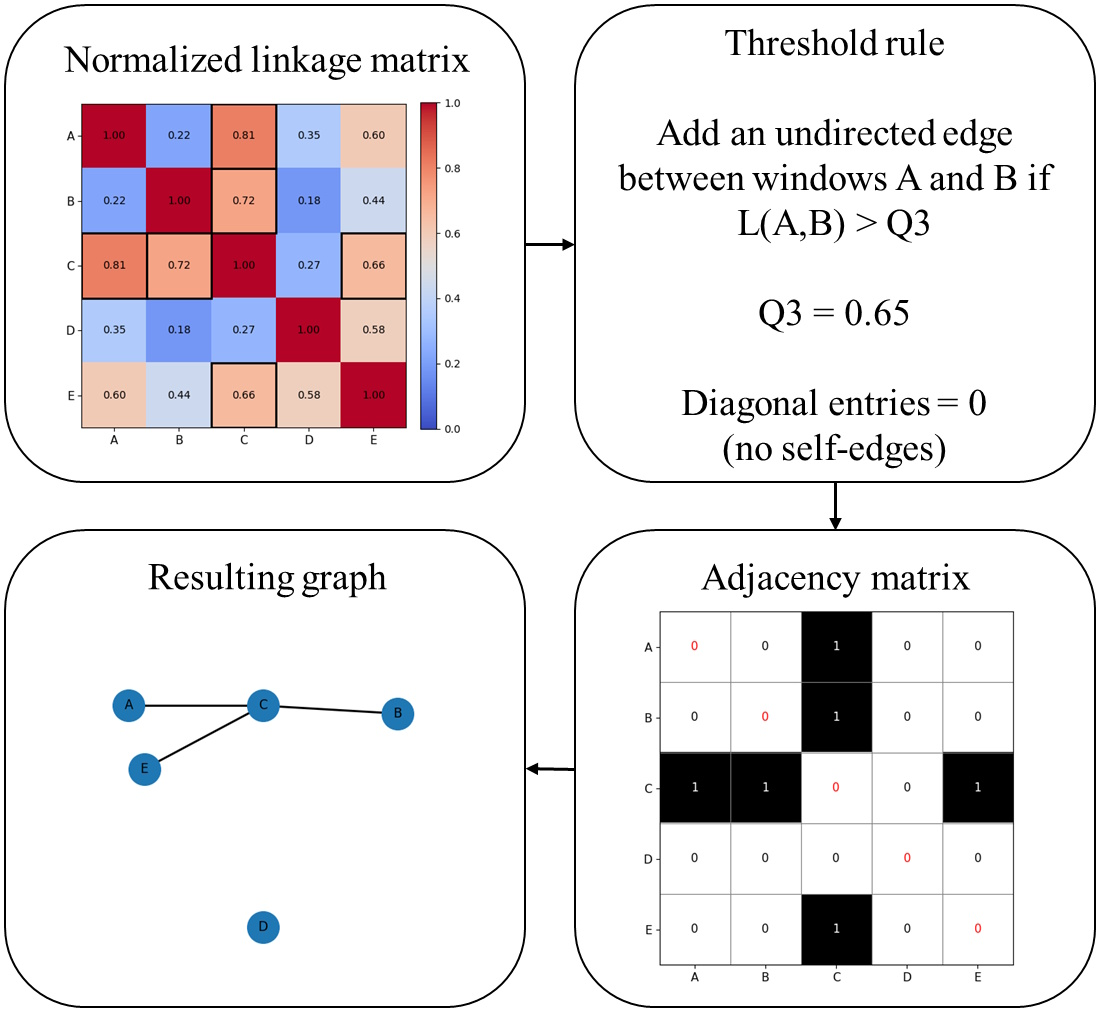
Example of constructing a graph from normalized linkage data. Each genomic window is represented as a node, and an undirected edge is added when the normalized linkage between two windows exceeds a selected threshold. Diagonal entries are set to 0 because self-edges are excluded.

In the example shown here, this threshold is set to the third quartile (Q3) of the normalized linkage values. Because a genomic window is not connected to itself, diagonal entries are set to 0. The resulting adjacency matrix is therefore symmetric, consistent with an undirected graph. This graph representation can then be used for subsequent analyses such as centrality measurement and community detection.

==== Assess centrality of windows ====
Once the adjacency matrix has been established, the windows can be assessed using several different measures of centrality. The different measures of centrality that can be used to interpret the matrix are betweenness centrality, closeness centrality, eigenvector centrality, and degree centrality. Each of these measures can highlight different areas of the network and different structural roles of genomic windows within it.

Betweenness centrality is calculated by considering the shortest paths between pairs of nodes and then determining how many of these paths pass through the node being observed, excluding cases in which it is itself an end node. This measure can help identify nodes that connect different parts of a network.

Closeness centrality is calculated by summing up all of the nodes in a network minus one and dividing that number by the sum of the shortest distances to each of the nodes in the graph. It is based on the shortest-path distances from one node to all other nodes in the network and can help identify nodes that are, on average, closer to the rest of the graph. See the included Figure 1 for an example.

Fig 1. The number next to each node indicates its shortest-path distance to the red square node. The green edges show one of the two shortest paths between the red circle node and the red square node. For the red square node, the sum of shortest-path distances to the other five nodes is 1+1+1+2+2=7, so its closeness centrality is 5/7.

Eigenvector centrality measures not only how many connections a node has, but also whether it is connected to other highly connected nodes. In this way, it can help identify nodes that are located in more influential or highly interconnected parts of the network.

Degree centrality is calculated by dividing the number of edges connected to a node by the total number of nodes minus one:

$C_D(i) = \frac{\sum_{j=1}^{n} a_{ij}}{n-1}$

where $a_{ij}$ represents whether node $i$ is connected to node $j$ in the adjacency matrix, and $n$ is the total number of nodes in the graph. The numerator counts the total number of connections of node $i$, and the denominator scales the value by the maximum possible number of neighbors. See the included Figure 2 for an example of this calculation.

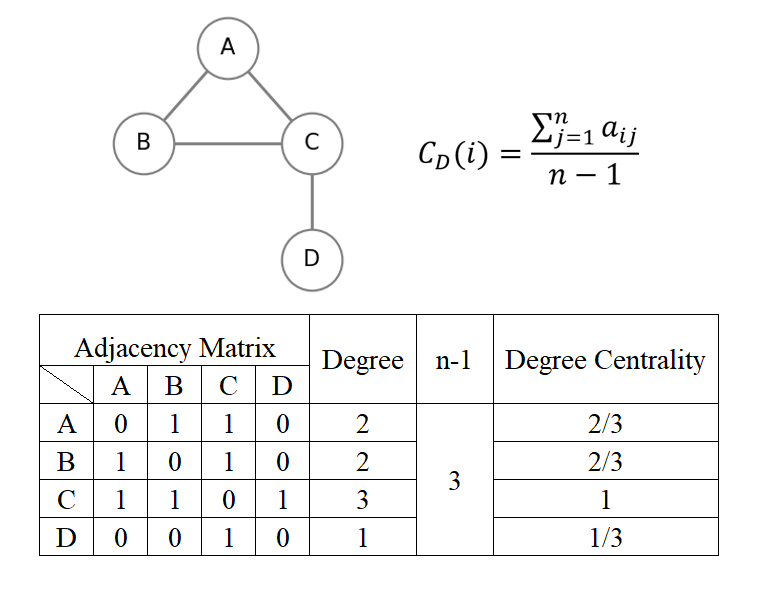
Fig 2. Example of calculating degree centrality from a simple graph and its adjacency matrix.

The centrality of a node can be a good indicator of its potential to be influential in the dataset based on its position and connections within the network.

==== Community detection ====
Once centrality values have been calculated, it becomes possible to infer related subsets of the data. These related subsets are called "communities": clusters of nodes that are more closely linked to one another than to the rest of the network. While community detection is commonly used in social network analysis and the mapping of social connections, it can also be applied to problems such as genomic interactions.

A relatively simple graph-based method for approximating communities is to identify several significant nodes using centrality measures, such as degree centrality, and then build communities around them. In one simple graph-based analysis of the Hist1 interaction network, the five nodes with the largest degree centrality were treated as hubs, and each community was defined as a hub together with its directly connected neighbors. If a node was connected to more than one hub, it was assigned to the community of the hub with which it had the strongest normalized linkage. This type of approximation can help identify groups of genomic windows with relatively strong local interaction patterns and may highlight potential chromatin interactions or other relationships that warrant further study.

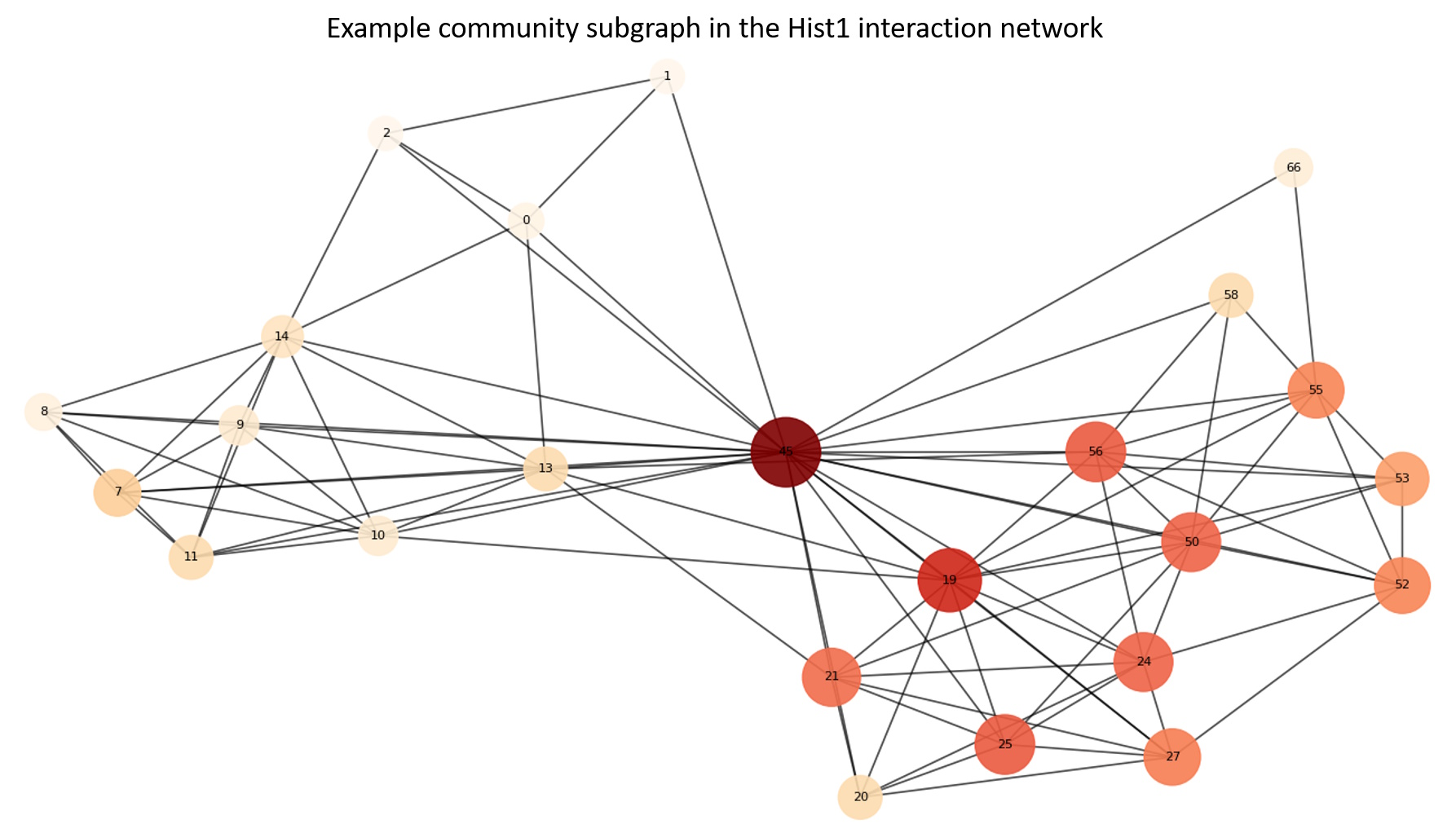
Example of a community subgraph identified around a hub window in the Hist1 interaction network. Node size and color reflect degree centrality within the overall network, and edges represent interactions among windows assigned to the community.

The resulting communities can be visualized either as subgraphs centered on hub windows or as local patterns in an adjacency heatmap. The subgraph view emphasizes the hub-and-neighbor structure of the community, while the heatmap view shows the same community in matrix form and highlights which genomic windows are connected within the selected subnetwork.

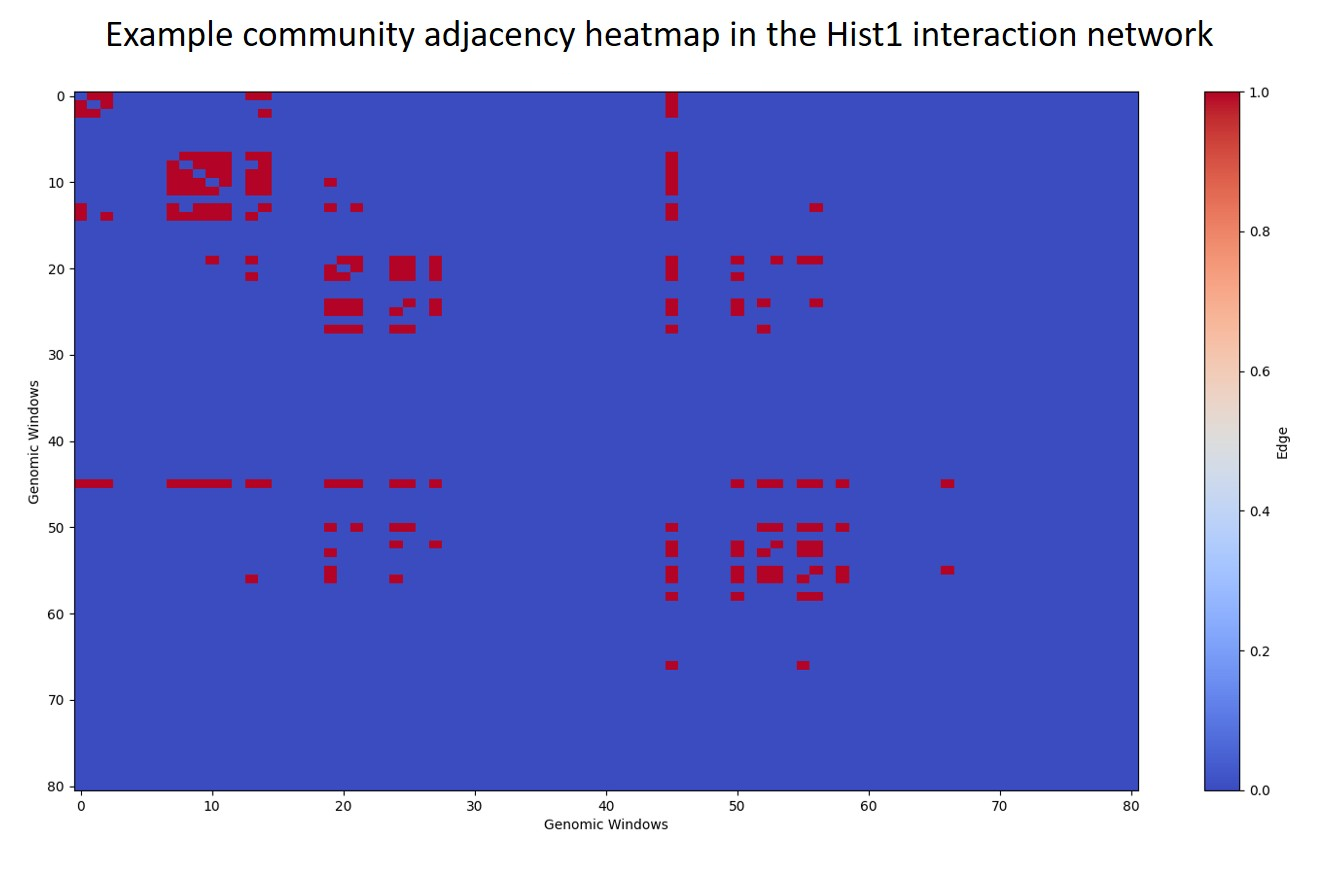
Adjacency heatmap for the same example community. Colored cells indicate edges among genomic windows assigned to the community, showing the local interaction pattern in matrix form.

== Advantages ==
Compared with chromosome conformation capture (3C)-based methods such as Hi-C, genome architecture mapping (GAM) provides several advantages:

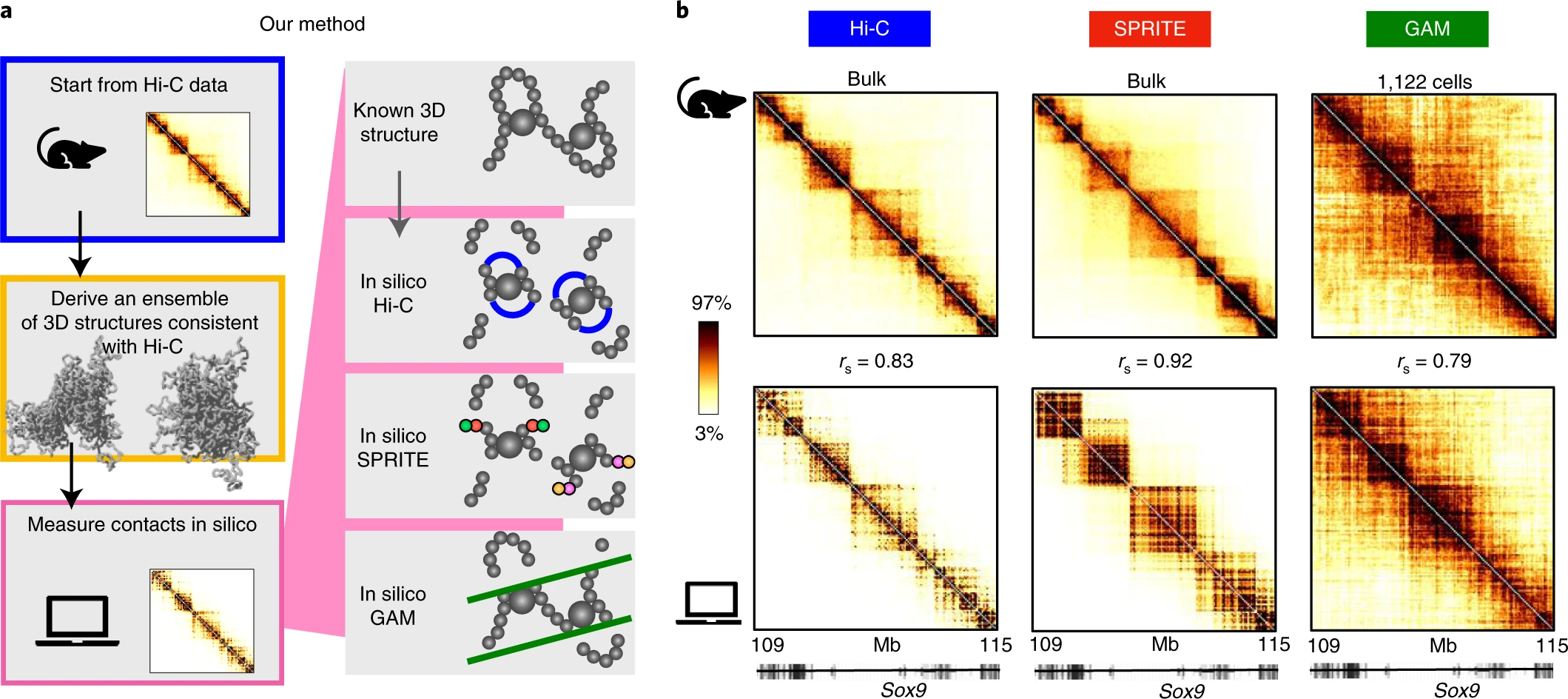
Comparison of GAM, SPRITE, and Hi-C across multiple categories

- GAM enables the detection of higher-order chromatin interactions, since it does not rely on proximity ligation between DNA fragments. In contrast, 3C-based methods such as Hi-C primarily capture pairwise contacts, whereas GAM can infer multi-way interactions (e.g., triplets or higher-order associations) based on co-segregation patterns across nuclear profiles.
- Unlike 3C-based approaches, GAM is a ligation-free method, as it does not require restriction enzyme digestion or proximity ligation. Instead, it is based on cryosectioning of individual nuclei followed by sequencing of nuclear slices, reducing biases associated with enzymatic fragmentation and ligation efficiency.
- GAM can also be applied to small numbers of cells, making it suitable for experimental conditions where biological material is limited. This is in contrast to some Hi-C protocols, which typically require large cell populations to generate high-resolution contact maps.

== Disadvantages ==
Despite its ability to detect higher-order chromatin interactions, genome architecture mapping (GAM) has several limitations compared with chromosome conformation capture (3C)-based approaches such as Hi-C.

- GAM is a lower-throughput method, as it relies on sequencing DNA from thin cryosections of individual nuclei, known as nuclear profiles. Each profile captures only a subset of the genome, requiring a large number of profiles to reconstruct genome-wide contact probabilities. By comparison, Hi-C produces dense genome-wide contact maps from bulk cell populations in a single experiment.
- In addition, GAM relies on statistical inference rather than direct ligation counts. Contact probabilities are estimated from the co-segregation of genomic loci across multiple nuclear slices, and computational models such as SLICE are required to reconstruct interaction frequencies.
- Finally, GAM has limited scalability and adoption relative to Hi-C. It is less widely used, has fewer standardized experimental and computational pipelines, and lacks extensive large-scale reference datasets, which can reduce reproducibility and complicate cross-study comparisons.
