= Matrices of concepts =

The structure of a matrice of concepts

The matrices of concepts are a conceptual tool put forth by philosopher Paul Franceschi, that aim at providing an alternative to the semiotic square described by Algirdas Greimas. To the difference of the semiotic square, a matrix of concepts is made up of 6 concepts, from which two are neutral, two are positive and two are negative. The relationships between the 6 concepts of the same matrix can be stated as follows:

- A0 and Ā0 are dual or inverse; A+ and Ā− are contraries; A− and Ā+ are contraries
- A+ and Ā+ are complementary, in the same way as A− and Ā-
- A+ and A− are corollary, in the same way as Ā+ and Ā−
- A0 and A+ are related, in the same way as A0 and A−, Ā0 and Ā+, Ā0 and Ā−

The applications of the matrices of concepts relate to paradigmatic analysis, but also to the dialectical plan, and more generally to the study of concepts.

== See also ==
- the semiotic square
