= Susan Petrilli =

Italian academic (born 1954)

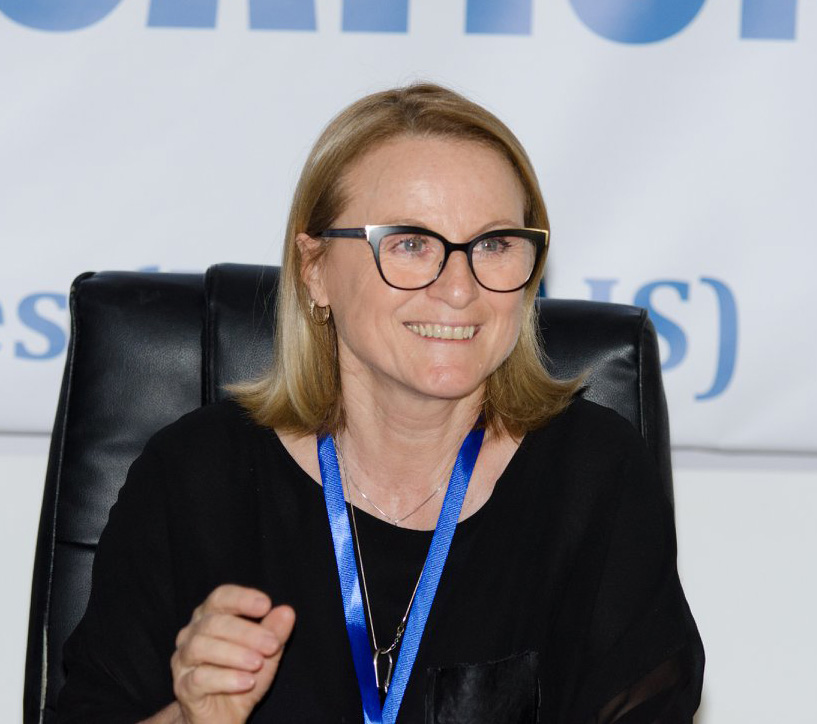
- Susan Petrilli in 2018
- Born: 3 November 1954 (age 71); Adelaide, South Australia, Australia

Philosophical work
- Era: 20th / 21st-century philosophy
- Region: Western philosophy
- School: Semiotics, significs
- Main interests: Philosophy of language

Susan Petrilli (born 3 November 1954) is an Italian semiotician, professor of philosophy and theory of languages at the University of Bari, Aldo Moro, Italy, and the seventh Thomas A. Sebeok Fellow of the Semiotic Society of America. She is also international visiting research fellow at the School of Psychology, the University of Adelaide, South Australia.

Petrilli is a leading scholar in semiotics. She has been a central figure in the recent recognition by semioticians that Victoria Lady Welby acted as the foremother of modern semiotics, alongside Charles Peirce, its forefather. Petrilli's book, Signifying and Understanding: Reading the Works of Victoria Welby and the Signific Movement (2009), underscored the invaluable contribution made by Welby to semiotics, her development of the ‘significs’ theory, and the influence her theory and published works bore on contemporary semioticians such as Peirce, Ogden and Vailati.

Petrilli devised, along with Augusto Ponzio, the theory of ‘semioethics’, located at the intersection of semiotics and ethics. This theory has been applied and reinterpreted in various scholarly fields, including law, medicine, language, communication, and architecture.

She published over one hundred books and peer-reviewed articles in the field of semiotics and philosophy of language, in both English and Italian. Her works have been translated into several languages, such as Mandarin Chinese, French, German, Greek, Portuguese, Serbian and Spanish.

She was recognized as a leading modern semiotician under “Susan Petrilli,” entry by Paul Cobley (ed.), The Routledge Companion to Semiotics, London, Routledge, 2010.

== Biography ==
Ferruccio Rossi-Landi commissioned Petrilli to write on Victoria Welby, for the Walter Schmitz volume Essays in Significs (1990). Sebeok thereafter invited her to examine the role played by Women in Semiotics, notably Victoria Lady Welby. What initially began as a short chapter on Welby, turned into years of archival research and a monumental book on Welby's published works and letters, namely Signifying and Understanding: Reading the Works of Victoria Welby and the Signific Movement. For this work, Petrilli consulted the Welby archives at York University, Toronto, Canada, the Lady Welby Library, University of London Library, and the British Library in London, United Kingdom. Welby's epistolary work was extensive, as she shared and tested ideas with approximately 460 contemporary semioticians and scholars. Paul Cobley remarked: ‘Petrilli’s odyssey (…) has taken her from Australia to Italy, from a PhD thesis idea to the depths of the archives, and now to a future for a politically inflected, ethnically permeated, semiotics’.

Petrilli's book on Welby led to a special issue dedicated to Victoria Welby in the Semiotica Journal, co-directed by Petrilli, which brought together articles written by 35 authors.

As noted by the late John Deely: ‘It is more than fitting that Susan Petrilli, who pioneered the development of semioethics within the major tradition of semiotics, is the one to whom Victoria Welby is indebted for being brought to the center stage of this major development’.

== Works and ideas ==
=== Semioethics ===
Petrilli's semioethics theory has been applied and discussed in over thirty five recently published essays and articles, including fifteen published in the American Journal of Semiotics since 2013, sixteen published in Semiotica since 2004, and others published in New Formations, Sign System Studies, Language and Dialogue, and in the legal field, notably in the International Journal for the Semiotics of Law, and the Cambridge International Law Journal, as it pertains to human rights and international law.

Regarding her theory, Petrilli explains:

Semioethics is not intended as a new branch of semiotics, but rather it refers to the human capacity for listening to the other, to the capacity for critique, deliberation and responsibility. Following Sebeok’s “global semiotics”, semioethics returns to the origin of semiotics understood as “medical sem(e)iotics” or “symptomatology” and, recalling its ancient vocation to care for life, thematizes the relation between signs and values, semiotics and axiology, semiotics, ethics and pragmatism.

Ronald C. Arnett adds:

[Petrilli] contends that the primary task of semioethics in this historical moment is the detotalization of global communication production systems. She intends semioethics as a critical and disruptive force capable of questioning global communication systems that dominate this historical moment. Semioethics challenges the characteristic unreflective social development inherent in modernity’s love of process and procedure. Petrilli connects semioethics to the mission of unmasking dominant ideologies that constitute globalized communication systems.

=== Academic honours ===
Petrilli was awarded the 7th Thomas A. Sebeok Fellow of the Semiotic Society of America in 2008, the tri-annual award for excellence in scholarship and contribution to the development of the doctrine of signs, for originality in research and for contributing to the circulation of semiotic studies internationally. She became Fellow of the International Communicology Institute in 2008, as among the top 100 scholars at a world level who have most influenced and guided studies in the field of “communicology”.

== Selected bibliography ==
=== Publications ===
- Signifying and Understanding. Reading the Works of Victoria Welby and the Signific Movement, Foreword by Paul Cobley, pp. vii-x [Book series, Semiotics, Communication and Cognition 2, Editor Paul Cobley], (Boston/Berlin, De Gruyter Mouton, 2009), 1048pp.
- Sign Crossroads in Global Perspective. Semioethics and Responsibility, editor John Deely, Preface, “In Her Own Voice”, pp. vii–ix, & “The Seventh Sebeok Fellow: Editor’s Introduction”, pp. xi–xiii, both by J. Deely, New Brunswick (U.S.A.) and London (U.K.), Transaction Publishers, 2010, 330pp.
- Expression and Interpretation in Language, Foreword by Vincent Colapietro, pp. xi–xiii, New Brunswick (U.S.A.) and London (U.K.), Transaction Publishers, 2012.
- The Self as a Sign, the World, and the Other. Living Semiotics, Foreword by Augusto Ponzio, pp. xiii–xvi, New Brunswick (U.S.A.) and London (U.K.), Transaction Publishers, 2013, 320pp.
- Victoria Welby and the Science of Signs. Significs, Semiotics, Philosophy of Language, Foreword, by Frank Nuessel, pp. xi–xviii. New Brunswick (U.S.A.) and London (U.K.), Transaction Publishers, 2015, 368pp.
- Sign Studies and Semioethics. Communication, Translation and Values [Semiotics, Communication and Cognition, book series directed by Paul Cobley and Kalevi Kull, Vol. 13], Boston, Berlin, De Gruyter Mouton, 2014. 398pp.
- The Global World and Its Manifold Faces. Otherness as the Basis of Communication. [Reflections on Signs and Language 1], Bern, Berlin, Bruxelles, Frankfurt am Main, New York, Oxford, Wien: Peter Lang, 2016. 348pp.
- Challenges to Living Together. Transculturalism, Migration, Exploitation [Philosophy 20], Milan, Mimesis International, Mimesis, 2017, 490pp.

=== Books ===
- Significs, semiotica, significazione, Preface by Thomas A. Sebeok (pp. 15–18), Bari, Adriatica, 1988, 290pp.
- Man as a Sign. Essays on the Philosophy of Language (Augusto Ponzio), Berlin, Mouton de Gruyter, 1990, 414pp. Appendix I: The Problem of Signifying in Welby, Peirce, Vailati, Bakhtin, pp. 313–363; Appendix II: On the Materiality of Signs, pp. 365–412.
- La ricerca semiotica (with O. Calabrese & A. Ponzio), Bologna, Esculapio, 1993, 290pp.
- Segno e valore. La significs di Welby e la semiotica novecentesca, Doctoral dissertation, 1993 / 1994, National Libraries, Rome and Florence, 350 pp.
- Fondamenti di filosofia del linguaggio (con A. Ponzio & P. Calefato), Bari, Laterza, 1994, 361pp. [Porguguese translation, see infra, n. 29].
- Materia segnica e interpretazione. Figure e prospettive, Lecce, Edizioni Milella, 1995, 412pp.
- Che cosa significa significare? Itinerari nello studio dei segni, Bari, Edizioni dal Sud, 1995, 278pp.
- Su Victoria Welby. Significs e filosofia del linguaggio [SEMIOSIS. Il senso e la fabbrica dei testi, Semiosis Su 4, book series directed by Massimo Bonfantini], Naples, Edizioni Scientifiche Italiane, 1998, 452pp.
- Basi. Significare, inventare, dialogare (with M. A. Bonfantini, C. Caputo, A. Ponzio, T. A. Sebeok), Lecce, Piero Manni, 1998, 393pp.
- Signs of Research on Signs. Semiotische Berichte (with A. Ponzio), mit: Linguistik Interdisziplinär, Jg. 22, 3, 4/1998, 183pp
- Teoria dei segni e del linguaggio, Bari, Graphis, 1998, 212 pp., 2 ed., 2001, 3a ed. 2011.
- Fuori campo. I segni del corpo tra rappresentazione ed eccedenza (with A. Ponzio), Milan, Mimesis, 1999, 431pp.
- Il sentire della comunicazione globale (with A. Ponzio), Rome, Meltelmi, 2000, 167pp.
- Philosophy of Language, Art and Answerability in Mikhail Bakhtin (with A. Ponzio), New York, Ottawa, Toronto, Legas, 2000.
- Semiotica dell’io (with T.A. Sebeok & A. Ponzio), Rome, Meltemi, 2001, 209pp.
- Thomas Sebeok and the Signs of Life (with A. Ponzio), [Postmodern Encounters, Editor Richard Appignanesi], Duxford (Cambridge, UK), Icon Book; USA, Totem Books, 2001, 77pp. [in Serbian translation, see infra n. 17, in Portuguese, see n. 39].
- Teoria dei segni e del linguaggio, Bari, Graphis, 1998, 212 pp., 2 ed., 2001.
- Thomas Sebeok i znakovi zivota, Znanost u Dzepu, Naklada Jesenski i Turk, Zagreb 2002.
- I segni e la vita. La semiotica globale di Thomas A. Sebeok (with A. Ponzio), Milan, Spirali, 2002, 279pp.
- Views in Literary Semiotics (with A. Ponzio), [It. trans. by S. Petrilli], New York, Ottawa, Toronto, Legas, 2003, 141pp.
- Semioetica (with A. Ponzio), Rome, Meltemi, 2003, 191pp.
- Semiotica globale. Il corpo nel segno (with M. Danesi & A. Ponzio), [parts by M. Danesi from English by S. Petrilli], Bari, Graphis, 2004, 141pp.
- Percorsi della semiotica, Bari, Graphis, 2005, 371pp.
- Reasoning with Levinas (with A. Ponzio & J. Ponzio), New York, Ottawa, Toronto, Legas, 2005, 57pp.
- Semiotics Unbounded. Interpretive Routes through the Open Network of Signs (with A. Ponzio) [Toronto Studies in Semiotics and Communication, Editors: Marcel Danesi, Umberto Eco, Paul Perron, Peter Schultz, Roland Posner], Toronto, Buffalo, London, Toronto, University Press of Toronto Press, 2005, 630pp. [Parts by A. Ponzio translated from Italian by S. Petrilli]. [Chinese translation, see infra, n. 54].
- The Semiotic Animal (with John Deely & Augusto Ponzio), New York, Ottawa, Toronto, Legas, 2005, 244pp. [Parts signed by A. Ponzio translated from Italian by S. Petrilli].
- La raffigurazione letteraria (with A. Ponzio), Milan, Mimesis, 2006, 304pp.
- Tesi per il futuro anteriore della semiotica. Il programma di ricerca della Scuola di Bari–Lecce (with C. Caputo & A. Ponzio), Milan, Mimesis, 2006, 140 pp.
- I dialoghi semiotici. Sul dialogo, sulla menzogna e la verità, sui nuovi mass–media, sulla retorica e l’argomentazione, sulla testualità e la discorsività, sull’ideologia e l’utopia 1982–2006 (with Massimo A. Bonfantini & Augusto Ponzio), Naples, Edizioni Scientifiche Italiane, 2006, 191pp.
- Fundamentos de Filosofia da Linguagem (with A. Ponzio & P. Calefato), Portuguese trans. by Ephraim F. Alves, Petrópolis, RJ (Brazil), Editora Vozes, 2007.
- Semiotics Today. From Global Semiotics to Semioethics, a Dialogic Response (con A. Ponzio), New York, Ottawa, Toronto, Legas, 2007, 84pp. [Le parti di A. Ponzio sono tradotte dall’italiano da S. Petrilli].
- Percorsi della semiotica, Bari, Graphis, 2a ed. 2700, 371pp.
- Lineamenti di semiotica e di filosofia del linguaggio (with A. Ponzio), Bari, Graphis, 2008, 379pp.
- Sign Crossroads in Global Perspective. Essays by Susan Petrilli, 7th SSA Sebeok Fellow. The American Journal of Semiotics, Volume 24.4 (2008), 305pp. [A publication of the Semiotic Society of America, Editor–in–Chief Joseph Brent, ed. and intro. by John Deely, “The Seventh Sebeok Fellow: Editor’s Introduction, iii–vi].
- Signifying and Understanding. Reading the Works of Victoria Welby and the Signific Movement, Foreword by Paul Cobley, pp. vii-x [Book series, Semiotics, Communication and Cognition 2, Editor Paul Cobley], Boston/Berlin, De Gruyter Mouton, 2009, 1048pp.
- Sign Crossroads in Global Perspective. Semioethics and Responsibility, editor John Deely, Preface, “In Her Own Voice”, pp. vii–ix, & “The Seventh Sebeok Fellow: Editor’s Introduction”, pp. xi–xiii, both by J. Deely, New Brunswick (U.S.A.) and London (U.K.), Transaction Publishers, 2010, 330pp. [This volume presents in monograph form, indexed, the first Sebeok Fellow Special Issue of The American Journal of Semiotics 24.4 (2008), published on the occasion of Dr. Petrilli's installation as the 7 SSA Sebeok Fellow at the 2008 33 Annual Meeting of the Semiotic Society of America].
- Roland Barthes. La visione ottusa (with J. Ponzio, G. Mininni, A. Ponzio, M. Solimini, L. Ponzio), Presentation by A. Ponzio, Milan, Mimesis, 2010.
- Parlando di segni con maestri di segni, Preface by Thomas A. Sebeok, Lecce, Pensa, Multimedia, 2011. [Book series Studi linguistici e semiotici, “Il segno e i suoi maestri”, Editors Cosimo Caputo, Susan Petrilli, & Augusto Ponzio, 5, La riflessione sui segni verbali e nonverbali e i testi dei Maestri], 254pp.
- Thomas Sebeok e os Signos da Vida (with A. Ponzio), Série Dialogaçoes, Dirigida por Maria Isabel de Moura, Tradução, Pedro Guilherme Orzari Bombonato, São Carlos, Pedro & João Editores, 2011.
- Teoria dei segni e del linguaggio, Bari, Graphis, 1998, 212 pp., 2 ed., 2001, 3a ed. 2011.
- Expression and Interpretation in Language, Foreword by Vincent Colapietro, pp. xi–xiii, New Brunswick (U.S.A.) and London (U.K.), Transaction Publishers, 2012.
- Interferenze. Pier Paolo Pasolini, Carmelo Bene e dintorni (with A. & L. Ponzio), Milan, Mimesis, 2012.
- Altrove e altrimenti. Filosofia del linguaggio, critica letteraria e teoria della traduzione in, intorno e a partire da Bachtin [book series Filosofie, n. 247, Editors Pierre Dalla Vigna & Luca Taddeo], Milan, Mimesis, 2012, 366pp.
- Un mondo di segni. L’avere senso e il significare qualcosa [book series “Nel Segno”, Editors Susan Petrilli & Augusto Ponzio, New Series 2012, 2.], Presentation by Augusto Ponzio, pp. 13–15, Bari, Edizioni Giuseppe Laterza, 2012, 424pp.
- Tempo, corpo, scrittura (with F. Silvestri, J. Ponzio & A. Ponzio). PLAT. Quaderni di pratiche linguistiche e analisi di testi, n. 1/2012. Lecce, Pensa Multimedia, 2012.
- The Self as a Sign, the World, and the Other. Living Semiotics, Foreword by Augusto Ponzio, xiii–xvi, New Brunswick (U.S.A.) and London (U.K.), Transaction Publishers, 2013, 320pp.
- Em outro lugar e de outro modo. Filosofia da linguagem, crítica literária e teoria da tradução em torno e a partir de Bakhtin, Tradução aos cuidados de Valdemir Miotello, Equipe de tradução Daniela M. Mondardo, Ana Beatriz Dias, Radamés Benevides, Valdemir Miotello, São Carlos - SP. Pedro & João Editores, novembro 2013.
- Riflessioni sulla teoria del linguaggio e dei segni [Filosofie, n. 327, book series directed by Pierre Dalla Vigna & Luca Taddeo], Milan-Udine, Mimesis, 2014, 295pp.
- Semioetica e comunicazione globale (with A. Ponzio) [= Athanor. Semiotica, Filosofia, Arte, Letteratura XXIV,17), Milan, Mimesis, 391pp.
- Sign Studies and Semioethics. Communication, Translation and Values [Semiotics, Communication and Cognition, book series directed by Paul Cobley and Kalevi Kull, Vol. 13], Boston, Berlin, De Gruyter Mouton, 2014. 398pp.
- Fuhao Jiangjjie: Cong Zongtifuhaoxue Dao Lunlifuhaoxue (Semiotic Horizons. From Global Semiotics to Semioethics), Chinese translation by Zhou Jingsong. Chengdu: Sichuan University Press, 2014. 315pp.
- Nella vita dei segni. Percorsi della semiotica [Filosofie, n. 350, book series directed by Pierre Dalla Vigna & Luca Taddeo], Milan, Mimesis, 2015. 377pp.
- Victoria Welby and the Science of Signs. Significs, Semiotics, Philosophy of Language, Foreword, by Frank Nuessel, pp. xi–xviii. New Brunswick (U.S.A.) and London (U.K.), Transaction Publishers, 2015, 368pp.
- 苏珊•彼得里利、奥古斯托•蓬齐，王永祥等译，2015年7月，《打开边界的符号学穿越》南京 (Semiotics Unbounded. Interpretive Routes through the Open Network of Signs), Chinese trans. by Yongxiang Wang, Peng Jia & Yu Hongbing, et alii, Nanjing, Yilin Press, 2015.
- Lineamenti di semiotica e di filosofia del linguaggio. Un contributo all’interpretazione del segno e all’ascolto della parola (with Augusto Ponzio), [Studi sul Linguaggio, sulla Comunicazione e sull’Apprendimento, 4. New series directed by Roberto Fedi & Marcel Danesi], Perugia: Guerra Edizioni, 2016, 315pp.
- The Global World and Its Manifold Faces. Otherness as the Basis of Communication. [Reflections on Signs and Language 1], Bern, Berlin, Bruxelles, Frankfurt am Main, New York, Oxford, Wien: Peter Lang, 2016. 348pp.
- The European School of Marxist Semiotics: Schaff-Rossi-Land-Bernard-Ponzio-Petrilli (with J. Bernard, A. Ponzio, F. Rossi-Landi, A. Schaff), edited by Zhang Bi, Tang Xiaolin, Introduction by S. Petrilli, “A European School of Marxist Semiotics”, Chengdu, Sichuan University Press, 2016. [In Chinese], 282pp.
- Challenges to Living Together. Transculturalism, Migration, Exploitation [Philosophy 20], Milan, Mimesis International, Mimesis, 2017, 490pp.
- Digressioni nella storia. Dal tempo del sogno al tempo della globalizzazione, [Linee 8], Milan, Meltemi Press, 2017, 466pp.
- Susan Petrilli, Parole e segni. Come sono usati, come parlarne, come vivere meglio con essi, Lecce, Pensa Multimedia, 2018.
- Signs, Language and Listening. A Semioethic Perspective, Ottawa, Toronto, New York: Legas, 2018.

=== Edited and/or translated books with introduction ===
- Dialogue, Iconicity and Meaning: Readings, ed. Eng. trans. Intro. pp. 9–41, by Susan Petrilli [= Theuth. Quaderni dell’Istituto di Filosofia del Linguaggio dell’Università di Bari], Bari, Adriatica, 1984, 289pp.
- Thomas A. Sebeok, Il segno e i suoi maestri, ed. It. trans. “Introduzione: Un libro di transizione,” pp. 5–21, by S. Petrilli, Bari, Adriatica, 1985, 388pp.
- Victoria Welby, Significato, metafora, interpretazione, ed. It. trans. intro., pp. 7–50, by S. Petrilli, Bari, Adriatica, 1985, 232pp.
- Augusto Ponzio, Massimo A. Bonfantini, Giuseppe Mininni, Per parlare dei segni/Talking About Signs, Eng. trans. by S. Petrilli, Bari, Adriatica, 1985, 558pp.
- Per Ferruccio Rossi–Landi. Il Protagora 11/12, XXVII, ed. and intr., pp. 7–9, by S. Petrilli, 1987, 206pp.
- Charles Morris, Segni e valori. Significazione e significatività e altri scritti di semiotica, etica ed estetica, ed. it. trans. & intro., pp. 5–28, by S. Petrilli, Bari, Adriatica, 1988, 244pp.
- Giovanni Manetti (ed.), Signs of Antiquity/Antiquity of Signs. Versus 50–51, English translation by S. Petrilli, Milan, Bompiani, 1990, 224pp.
- Gérard Deledalle, Charles Sanders Peirce: An Intellectual Biography, ed. Eng. trans. & “Introduction: On the semiotics of interpretation,” pp. xi–xxvii, by S. Petrilli, foreword by Max H. Fisch, pp. xxix–xxx, Amsterdam – Philadelphia, John Benjamins, 1990, 91pp.
- Augusto Ponzio, Man as a Sign. Essays on the Philosophy of Language, ed. Eng. trans. & Introduction, pp. 1–13, by S. Petrilli, Appendix I: “The Problem of Signifying in Welby, Peirce, Vailati, Bakhtin”, pp. 313–363; Appendix II: “On the Materiality of Signs”, pp. 365–393, by S. Petrili, Berlin, New York, Mouton de Gruyter, 1990, 414pp.
- Thomas A. Sebeok, Penso di essere un verbo, ed. It. trans., & Intro., pp. 11–18, by Susan Petrilli, Palermo, Sellerio, 1990, 35 pp.
- Giorgio Fano, The Origins and Nature of Language, ed. Eng. trans., & “Translator’s Introduction: Iconicity and the Origin of Language,” pp. xvii–xxvii, by Susan Petrilli, Bloomington & Indianapolis, Indiana University Press, 1992, 338pp.
- Thomas A. Sebeok, Sguardo sulla semiotica americana, ed., It. trans. & Intro., pp. 1–9, di Susan Petrilli, Milan, Bompiani, 1992, 218pp.
- Ferruccio Rossi–Landi, Between Signs and Non–signs, edited and Introduction, pp. ix–xxix, by Susan Petrilli, Amsterdam, John Benjamins, 1992, 328pp.
- Social Practice, Semiotics and the Sciences of Man: The Correspondence between Morris and Rossi–Landi. Semiotica. Journal of the International Association for Semiotic Studies 88, 1/2, 1992. Special Issue, edited, critical comment, and Introduction, pp. 1–36, S. Petrilli, 202 pp.
- Semiotics in the United States and Beyond: Problems, People, and Perspectives. Special Issue, Semiotica. Journal of the International Association for Semiotic Studies, 97–3/4, 1993, ed. and Introduction, “An International Community of Inquirers”, pp. 217–218 (with John Deely), 444pp. Rédacteur en chef Thomas A. Sebeok. [This Special Issue of Semiotica, guest edited by Petrilli and Deely, consists of papers resulting from the 6–10 July 1992 seminar occasioned by the publication of Sebeok's book Semiotics in the United States, and held at the Centro Internazionale di Semiotica e Linguistica in Urbino, Italy. Sebeok's “Introductory Remarks” opening the seminar were recorded, transcribed and published posthumously under the title “Opening remarks, July 6, 1992, for the seminar ‘Semiotics in the United States’ held in Urbino, Italy”, in Semiotica 147–1/4 (2003), 75–102, including an “Editors’ afterword in two parts” by Deely (“Urbino in retrospect”, 96–99) and Petrilli (“American semiotics in Sebeok’s perspective”, 99–100)].
- Augusto Ponzio, Signs, Dialogue and Ideology, ed. & Eng. trans. by S. Petrilli, Amsterdam, John Benjamins, 1993, 188pp.
- Thomas A. Sebeok, Come comunicano gli animali che non parlano, ed., It. trans. & Intro. “Comunicazione e alterità,” pp. 7–21, by Susan Petrilli, Bari, Edizioni del Sud, 1998, 206pp.
- Thomas A. Sebeok, A sign is just a sign. La semiotica globale, ed., It. trans. & Intro., “Comunicazione mondializzata e semiotica planetaria,” pp. 7–18, by Susan Petrilli, Milan, Spirali, 1998, 346pp.
- Nero [Athanor. Arte, letteratura, semiotica, filosofia IX, 1, 1998], ed. by Susan Petrilli, 1998, 300pp. Lecce, Manni.
- Semiotic Studies in Bari. S–European Journal for Semiotic Studies, vol. 11–4, ed. & Intro. “Trajectories in Semiotic Studies from Bari. Foreword”, pp. 513–515, by Susan Petrilli [Editor–in–chief: Jeff Bernard], 1999, 207pp.
- Charles, Morris, Lineamenti di una teoria dei segni, It. trans., comment & ed. by F. Rossi-Landi, new ed. & Intro., “La biosemiotica di Morris,” pp. 9–52, by Susan Petrilli, Lecce, Manni, 1999, 184pp.
- Charles Morris, Significazione e significatività. Studio sui rapporti tra segni e valori, ed. It. trans. & Intro. pp. v–xxxv, by Susan Petrilli, Bari, Graphis, 2000, 111pp.
- La traduzione. Athanor. Semiotica, filosofia, arte, letteratura X, 2, 1999/2000, pp. v–xxxv, ed. & Intro. “Traduzione e semiosi: considerazioni introduttive,” pp. 9–22, by Susan Petrilli, Rome, Meltemi, 284pp.
- Tra segni. Athanor. Semiotica, filosofia, arte, letteratura XI, 3, 2000, ed. & Intro. “Tra segni,” pp. 7–9, by S. Petrilli, Rome, Meltemi, 263pp.
- Lo stesso altro. Athanor. Semiotica, filosofia, arte, letteratura XII, 4, 2001, ed. by Susan Petrilli, Rome, Meltemi, 293pp.
- Signs and Light. Illuminating Paths in the Semiotic Web. Semiotica. Journal of the International Association for Semiotic Studies, 136–3/4, 2001, Special Issue, ed. by Susan Petrilli, Intro. by Augusto Ponzio, pp. 1–2, Intro. by Susan Petrilli, pp. 3–6, 571pp.
- Charles Morris, L’io aperto. Il soggetto e le sue metamorfosi, ed. It. trans., Intro. “Charles Morris e la scienza dell’uomo. Conoscenza, libertà, responsabilità,” pp. vii–xxvi, by S. Petrilli, Bari, Graphis, 2002, 173pp.
- Thomas A. Sebeok, Segni. Una introduzione alla semiotica, ed. It. trans. & Intro., “La svolta semiotica di Thomas A. Sebeok,” pp. 11–44, by S. Petrilli, Rome, Carocci, 2003, 224pp.
- Linguaggi, ed. & Intro. pp. 15–25, by S. Petrilli, Bari, Giuseppe Laterza, 2003, 600pp.
- Translation Translation, edited with an Introduction by Susan Petrilli, “Translation and Semiosis,” pp. 17–37, Amsterdam, Rodopi, 2003, 660pp.
- Logica, dialogica, ideologica. I segni tra funzionalità ed eccedenza, ed. (in collab. with P. Calefato) & Intro., “Semiosi, infunzionalità, semiotica. Introduzione” pp. 11–17, Milan, Mimesis, 2003, 495pp.
- Nero. Athanor. Athanor. Semiotica, filosofia, arte, letteratura XIV, 6, 2003, Rome, Meltemi. [new revised edition of Nero. Athanor, IX, ns. 1,1998.], 169pp.
- David Buchbinder, Sii uomo! Studio sulle identità maschili, ed. & Intro., pp. 7–11, by Susan Petrilli, Milan, Mimesis, 2004.
- Lavoro immateriale. Athanor. Semiotica, Filosofia, Arte, Letteratura XIV, 2003–2004, ed. by Susan Petrilli, Rome, Meltemi, 358pp.
- Ideology, Logic, and Dialogue in Semioethic Perspective. Semiotica. Journal of the International Association for Semiotic Studies, 148–1/4, 2004. Special Issue, Guest Editor Susan Petrilli, Introduction, pp. 1–9, 457pp.
- John Deely, Basi della semiotica, “Nel segno”, book series directed by Susan Petrilli & Augusto Ponzio, Bari, Giuseppe Laterza, 2004. (Preface” in coll. with Augusto Ponzio, pp. 7–10.
- Maria Solimini, Anthropology, Otherness, and Existential Enterprise, Eng. trans. by Susan Petrilli, New York, Ottawa, Toronto, Legas, 2005, 78pp.
- Con Roland Barthes. Alle sorgenti del senso, ed. by Augusto Ponzio, Patrizia Calefato, Susan Petrilli, Presentation by P. Calefato & S. Petrilli, pp. 11–14, Intro., “Dare voce a Barthes”, by Augusto Ponzio, Rome, Meltemi, 2006, 695pp.
- Augusto Ponzio, The Dialogic Nature of Sign, Eng. trans. by Susan Petrilli, New York, Ottawa, Toronto, Legas, 2006.
- Comunicazione, interpretazione, traduzione, ed. & Intro., “Comunicare, interpretare, tradurre,”, pp. 11–20, by Susan Petrilli, Milan, Mimesis, 2006, 651pp.
- Cuore di mamma e altri racconti africani, ed. by Carmela Ferrandes, Susan Petrilli, Augusto Ponzio & Jean Emmanuel Konvolbo, with a conversation between C. Ferrandes, S. Petrilli & A. Ponzio, “Conversando intorno a Cuore di mamma,” pp. 35–41, a text by Massimo del Pizzo, “Tempi e geografie del narrare,” pp. 45–51, and designs by Luciano Ponzio, Lanciano, Barabba, 2006.
- White Matters. Il bianco in questione. Athanor. Semiotica, Filosofia, Arte, Letteratura XVII, ns. 10, 2006–07, ed. & Intro., “Sulla questione bianca e i discorsi secondo cui se ne parla”, pp. 9–38, by Susan Petrilli, Rome, Meltemi, 489pp.
- Augusto Ponzio, Emmanuel Levinas. Globalisation, and Preventive Peace, Preface by Marcel Danesi, Eng. trans. by Susan Petrilli, New York, Ottawa, Toronto, Legas, 2007.
- Victoria Welby, Senso, significato, significatività, ed. It. trans. Intro., “Il senso e il valore del significare,” pp. vii–lx, by Susan Petrilli, Bari, Graphis, 2007, 209pp.
- La filosofia del linguaggio come arte dell’ascolto. Sulla ricerca scientifica di Augusto Ponzio / Philosophy of language as the art of listening. On Augusto Ponzio’s scientific research, cura e Premessa, “Ouverture”, pp. 9–11, di S. Petrilli, Bari, Edizioni dal Sud, 2007, 473pp.
- Tutt’altro. Infunzionalità ed eccedenza come prerogative dell’umano, ed. & Preface, pp. 9–12, buy Susan Petrilli, Milan, Mimesis, 2008, 140pp.
- Approaches to Communication. Trends in Global Communication Studies, Preface, “Semiotics in Theory and Practice”, pp. 9–12, by Marcel Danesi, ed. & Intro., “Life in Global Communication”, pp. 13–26, by Susan Petrilli, Madison (WI), Atwood, 2008, 387pp.
- Masculinities. Identità maschili e appartenenze culturali, ed. by David Buchbinder & Susan Petrilli, It. trans. edited by Susan Petrilli, Milan, Mimesis, 2009.
- Eero Tarasti, Introduzione alla semiotica esistenziale, It. trans. by Massimo Berruto, Intro. by Augusto Ponzio & Susan Petrilli, “La semiotica esistenziale come piega della semiotica generale e delle semiotiche speciali”, pp. 7–15, Bari, Giuseppe Laterza, 2009.
- Thomas S. Szasz, “La mia follia mi ha salvato”. La follia e il matrimonio di Virginia Woolf, ed. It. trans., Intro., “Follia e psichiatria. La critica di Thomas Szasz al mito della malattia mentale”, pp. 7–59, by Susan Petrilli, Milan, Spirali, 2009.
- Charles Morris, Lineamenti di una teoria dei segni, It. trans. & comment by F. Rossi-Landi; Presentation, “Presentazione: Charles Morris e Ferruccio Rossi–Landi”, pp. 7–8, by Augusto Ponzio, Introduction, “Segno e simbolo nella biosemiotica di Morris”, pp. 9–32, by Susan Petrilli, Lecce, Pensa Multimedia 2009.
- Rosa Stella Cassotti, I linguaggi della musica nel circolo di Bachtin e oltre, Presentation by Augusto Ponzio & Susan Petrilli, pp. 9–10, Bari, Giuseppe Laterza, 2009.
- Semiotica. Journal of the International Association for Semiotic Studies / Revue de l’Association Internationale de Sémiotique, Special Issue: Part I, On John Deely’s Four Ages of Understanding, Guest editors Susan Petrilli (Bari, Italy), John P. Hittinger (Houston, TX), “Why read Deely? Introduction to the Four Ages special Issue”, pp. 1–9, by S. Petrilli & J. P. Hittinger, Vol. 178, n. 1/4, 2010.
- Semiotica. Journal of the International Association for Semiotic Studies / Revue de l’Association Internationale de Sémiotique, Special Issue: Part II, On John Deely’s Four Ages of Understanding, Guest editors Susan Petrilli (Bari, Italy), John P. Hittinger (Houston, TX), “Why read Deely? Introduction to the Four Ages special Issue”, pp. 1–9, by S. Petrilli & J. P. Hittinger, vol. 179, n. 1/4, 2010.
- Victoria Welby, Interpretare, comprendere, comunicare, ed. Eng. trans. & Intro., “Le risorse del significare”, pp. 11–96, by Susan Petrilli, Rome, Carocci, 2010, 255pp.
- “Semiotics Continues to Astonish”: Thomas A. Sebeok and the Doctrine of Signs. Thomas A. Sebeok and the Doctrine of Signs, edited and “Introduction: Thomas A. Sebeok: Biography and 20th century role,” pp. 1–17, by Paul Cobley, John Deely, Kalevi Kull, Susan Petrilli (= Semiotics, Communication and Cognition 7. Eds. P. Cobley & K. Kull), Berlin/Boston: De Gruyter Mouton, 2011.
- Charles Morris, Scritti di semiotica, etica e estetica, ed. It. trans. & Intro., by Susan Petrilli, Lecce, Multimedia, 2012.
- On and Beyond Significs: Centennial Issue for Victoria Lady Welby (1837–1912), Semiotica. Journal of the International Association for Semiotic Studies / Revue de l’Association Internationale de Sémiotique, 2013, 196, 1–4. Special Issue: Guest editors Frank Nuessel, Vincent Colapietro, & Susan Petrilli, Intro. by F. Nuessel & V. Colapietro, pp. 1–12. Appendix I, pp. 513–550, Appendix II, pp. 551–570, by S. Petrilli. Editor-in-Chief, Marcel Danesi.
- Writing, Voice, Undertaking, ed. & Intro. Susan Petrilli, New York, Ottawa, London, Legas, 2013.
- Comunicazione globale e semioetica, Athanor XXV, 17, 2014, ed. by Susan Petrilli, Rome, Meltemi, 2014.
- “Foreword”, in Genevieve Vaughan, The Gift in the Heart of Language. The Maternal Source of Meaning, Milan, Mimesis, 2015.
- Scienze dei linguaggi e linguaggi delle scienze. Intertestualità, interferenze, mutuazioni, ed. and Presentation Susan Petrilli, pp. 9–11. Athanor XXV, 18, Milan, Mimesis, 2014, 513pp.
- Hidden Meanings in Legal Discourse. Semiotica. Journal of the International Association for Semiotic Studies / Revue de l’Association Internationale de Sémiotique, Special Issue, ed. by Le Cheng & Susan Petrilli, Intro. by Le Cheng, 2016, pp. 1–4, 418pp.
- Fedi, credenze, fanatismo, Athanor XXVI, 19, ed. & Presentation, Gaetano Dammacco & Susan Petrilli, pp. 9–10, Milan, Mimesis, 2016, 437pp.
- Pace, pacificazione, pacifismo e i loro linguaggi, Athanor XXVII, 20, ed. by Susan Petrilli, Presentation by Susan Petrilli & Augusto Ponzio, pp. 11–12, Milan, Mimesis, 2017.
- Charles Morris, L’io aperto. Il soggetto e le sue metamorfosi, ed., It. trans., Intro. S. Petrilli, “Precognizioni dei rischi attuali dell’Occidente, L’io aperto di Charles Morris”, pp. 11–48, Lecce, Pensa Multimedia Editore, 2017, 292pp.
- L’immagine nella parola, nella musica e nella pittura (“Athanor. Semiotica, Filosofia, Arte, Letteratura” XXVIII, 21, series founded and directed by Augusto Ponzio), ed. Susan Petrilli, Presentation by Susan Petrilli and Augusto Ponzio, pp. 9–10, Milan, Mimesis, 2018.
