= Hans Ernst Pinsker =

Austrian linguist

Hans Pinsker
- Born: 1909
- Died: 1987 (aged 77–78)
- Occupation: Linguist

Academic work
- Institutions: University of Vienna
- Notable students: Nikolaus Ritt Herbert Schendl Barbara Seidlhofer
- Notable works: Historische Englische Grammatik: Elemente der Laut-, Formen- und Wortbildungslehre (in German)

Hans Pinsker (1909–1987) was an Austrian linguist.

He was Professor and Chair at the Department of English at the University of Vienna. Pinsker is perhaps best known for his introduction to English historical grammar (written in German), which appeared in multiple editions (e.g. 2nd, rev. ed. 1963. 3rd ed. 1974 edition). He is also noted as an accomplished member of the Vienna School of English Linguistics ("Anglistik") and held the "Luick Chair" before Herbert Koziol and Herbert Schendl. Pinsker worked on Indo-European in addition to English historical linguistics.

Pinsker received a festschrift for his 70th birthday and other dedications for his 65th. After his death, the Hans-Pinsker-Fund, administered by the "Luick" Chair, was instituted to support student research in English Historical Linguistics.

== Notable students ==
Notable students of Pinsker include:

- Peter Krämer, a German linguist
- Nikolaus Ritt, an English historical linguist
- Herbert Schendl, an English historical linguist

== Publications ==
- Pinsker, Hans. 1974. Historische Englische Grammatik: Elemente der Laut-, Formen- und Wortbildungslehre. 3rd ed. Munich: Hueber.
