= Irmengard Rauch =

American linguist (1933–2025)

Irmengard Rauch (April 17, 1933 – January 9, 2025) was an American linguist and semiotician.

== Biography ==
Rauch was professor emeritus of Germanic Linguistics at the University of California, Berkeley, where she held a position in the Department of German from 1982 until her retirement in 2021.

She completed her undergraduate work at the University of Dayton, took an M.A. degree from Ohio State University, and earned her PhD from the University of Michigan in 1962. Her dissertation was published by Mouton in 1967 under the title, The Old High German Diphthongization: a description of a phonemic change. Her supervisor was Herbert Penzl. She held positions at the University of Illinois (1968–82); the University of Pittsburgh (1966–68); the Univ. of Wisconsin (1962–66) before coming to Berkeley.

Rauch was the editor of the book series Berkeley Insights in Linguistics and Semiotics; Berkeley Models of Grammars; Studies in Old Germanic Languages and Literatures; co-editor of the Interdisciplinary Journal for Germanic Linguistics and Semiotic Analysis.

She died on January 9, 2025, at the age of 91.

== Honors and recognition ==
- 2011 Eighth Thomas A. Sebeok Fellow (Semiotic Society of America)
- 1998 Festschrift: Interdigitations: Essays for Irmengard Rauch
- 1996 Honorary Member, American Association of Teachers of German
- 1994 President, Fifth Congress of the IASS
- 1985 Distinguished Alumnus Award, University of Dayton
- 1982 Guggenheim Fellow
- 1981–83 President, Semiotic Society of America
- Life Member, Modern Language Association, Linguistic Society of America

== Selected works ==
=== Author ===
- The Old High German Diphthongization: A Description of a Phonemic Change. Janua Linguarum, Series Practica XXXVI. The Hague: Mouton. 1967. [Revised dissertation]
- Der Heliand. Wege der Forschung CCCXXI. Co-ed. J. Eichhoff. Introduction, I. Rauch and J. Eichhoff, p. VII-XIX. Darmstadt: Wissenschaftliche Buchgesellschaft, 1973.
- The Old Saxon Language: Grammar, Epic Narrative, Linguistic Interference. New York: Peter Lang Publishing, 1992. ISBN 9780820418933
- The Gothic Language: Grammar, Genetic Provenance and Typology, Readings. New York: Peter Lang Publishing, 2003. ISBN 9781433110757
- The Phonology / Paraphonology Interface and the Sounds of German across Time. New York: Peter Lang Publishing, 2008.
- The Gothic Language: Grammar, Genetic Provenance and Typology, Readings. (2nd ed.) New York: Peter Lang Publishing, 2011.
- The Phonology/Paraphonology Interface and the Sounds of German across Time. New York: Peter Lang Publishing. 2011. ISBN 9781433101151
- BAG — Bay Area German Linguistic Fieldwork Project. New York: Peter Lang Publishing, 2015. ISBN 9781433120497
- Selected Writings of Irmengard Rauch, ed. G.F. Carr. New York: Peter Lang Publishing, 2019. ISBN 9781433136061

=== Editor ===
- Editor: Approaches in Linguistic Methodology. Co-ed. C. T. Scott. Introduction, I. Rauch and C. T. Scott, pp. 3–8. Madison: University of Wisconsin Press. 1967. [Translated as Estudios de metodologia linguistica, (trans. into Spanish by M. L. Guillen). Madrid: Editorial Gredos, 1974.]
- Editor: Linguistic Method: Essays in Honor of Herbert Penzl. Co-ed. Gerald F. Carr. "Introduction: Linguistic Method, A Matter of Principle," I. Rauch, pp. 19–23 [=Janua Linguarum, Series Major 79]. The Hague: Mouton, 1979.
- Editor: The Signifying Animal: The Grammar of Language and Experience. Co-ed. G.F. Carr. Bloomington: The Indiana University Press, 1980.
- Editor: Language Change. Co-ed. G. F. Carr. Preface I. Rauch, pp. vii-x. Bloomington: The Indiana University Press, 1983.
- Editor: The Semiotic Bridge: Trends from California. Co-ed. G.F.Carr. Berlin: Mouton de Gruyter, 1989.
- Editor: The American Journal of Semiotics, vol. 9, no.4 (1992), co-ed. G.F.Carr.
- Editor: On Germanic Linguistics: Issues and Methods. Co-ed. G. F. Carr and R. Kyes. Preface I. Rauch, pp. v-vi [=Trends in Linguistics 68] Berlin: Mouton de Gruyter,. 1992.
- Editor: Insights in Germanic Linguistics I. Methodology in Transition. Co-ed. G. F. Carr. Trends in Linguistics, vol 83. Berlin: Mouton de Gruyter, 1995.
- Editor: Insights in Germanic Linguistics II. Classic and Contemporary. Co-ed. G.F. Carr. [=Trends in Linguistics 94.]. Berlin: Mouton de Gruyter, 1996.
- Editor: Across the Oceans. Studies from East to West in Honor of Richard K. Seymour. Co-ed. Cornelia Moore. "Introduction: Across Cultures, Across Disciplines," I Rauch, xvii-xix. Honolulu: University of Hawaii, 1995. ISBN 9780824816933
- Editor: Semiotics Around the World: Synthesis in Diversity. Proceedings of the Fifth Congress of the IASS, Berkeley, California, June 12–18, 1994. Vols I & II. Co-ed. G.F. Carr. Berlin: Mouton de Gruyter, 1996.
- Editor: Semiotic Insights: The Data Do the Talking. Toronto: University of Toronto Press, 1998.
- Editor: New Insights in Germanic Linguistics I. Co-ed G.F. Carr. New York: Peter Lang Publishing, 1999.
- Editor: New Insights in Germanic Linguistics II. Co-ed G. F. Carr. New York: Peter Lang Publishing, 2001.
- Editor: New Insights in Germanic Linguistics III. Co-ed G.F. Carr. New York: Peter Lang Publishing, 2002.
