= Semiotic Society of America =

Study of signs and sign-systems

The Semiotic Society of America is the major and leading semiotics organization in North America, serving scholars from many disciplines with common interests in semiotics, the study of signs and sign systems. It was founded in 1975. Its official journal is The American Journal of Semiotics. The Society also publishes the proceedings of its annual conferences. Memberships in the society and publication of the journal are managed by the Philosophy Documentation Center.

As its symbol, the Society uses caduceus, the staff of a messenger bearing a message, as a sign of a sign.

== Publications of the Semiotic Society of America ==
- The American Journal of Semiotics, 1981–present
- Semiotics: The Proceedings of the Semiotic Society of America, or Semiotics: Yearbook of the Semiotic Society of America; 1980–present ISSN:0742-7611. An annual series that publishes a selection of the peer-reviewed papers presented at the society's annual conference. The content and thematic focus of each volume varies based on the program of the annual meeting.
- Semiotic Scene: Bulletin of the Semiotic Society of America, 1977-1981
- Bulletin of Literary Semiotics, 1975-1977

== Presidents ==
According to the society's official website, the Presidents of the Society have included:

- 1976: Henry Hiz
- 1977: Eugen Baer
- 1978: Thomas G. Winner
- 1979: Max H. Fisch
- 1980: Allen Walker Read
- 1981: Richard Bauman
- 1982: Harley C. Shands
- 1983: Irmengard Rauch
- 1984: Thomas A. Sebeok
- 1985: Donald Preziosi
- 1986: Michael Riffaterre
- 1987: Naomi S. Baron
- 1988: Jonathan Culler
- 1989: Bennetta Jules-Rosette
- 1990: Robert Scholes
- 1991: Linda Waugh
- 1992: Nancy Armstrong
- 1993: (David Savan - died before taking office)
- 1993: Michael Shapiro
- 1994: Richard Lanigan
- 1995: Eugen Baer
- 1996: Roberta Kevelson
- 1997: Myrdene Anderson
- 1998: Jean Umiker-Sebeok
- 1999: Floyd Merrell
- 2000: William Pencak
- 2001: John Deely
- 2002: Paul Perron
- 2003: Vincent Colapietro
- 2004–2005: Cary William Spinks
- 2006: Joseph Brent
- 2007: Nathan Houser
- 2008: Robert Hatten
- 2009: Thomas Broden
- 2010: John Coletta
- 2011: Frank Nuessel
- 2012: Isaac Catt
- 2013: André DeTienne
- 2014: Elliot Gaines
- 2015: Marcel Danesi
- 2016: Ted J. Baenziger
- 2017: Deborah Smith-Shank
- 2018: Deborah Eicher-Catt
- 2019: Farouk Y. Seif
- 2020: Frank Macke
- 2021: Ronald C. Arnett
- 2022–2023: Michael Raposa
- 2023–2024: Hongbing Yu

== Honorary members ==
The "Sebeok fellow" award is the highest honor given by the Semiotic Society of America. The Sebeok fellows are David Savan (1992), John Deely (1993), Paul Bouissac (1996), Jesper Hoffmeyer (2000), Kalevi Kull (2003), Floyd Merrell (2005), Susan Petrilli (2008), Irmengard Rauch (2011), Paul Cobley (2014), Vincent Colapietro (2018), Nathan Houser (2019), Marcel Danesi (2020).

== See also ==
- International Association for Semiotic Studies
