= Pop icon =

Iconic person or object in popular culture

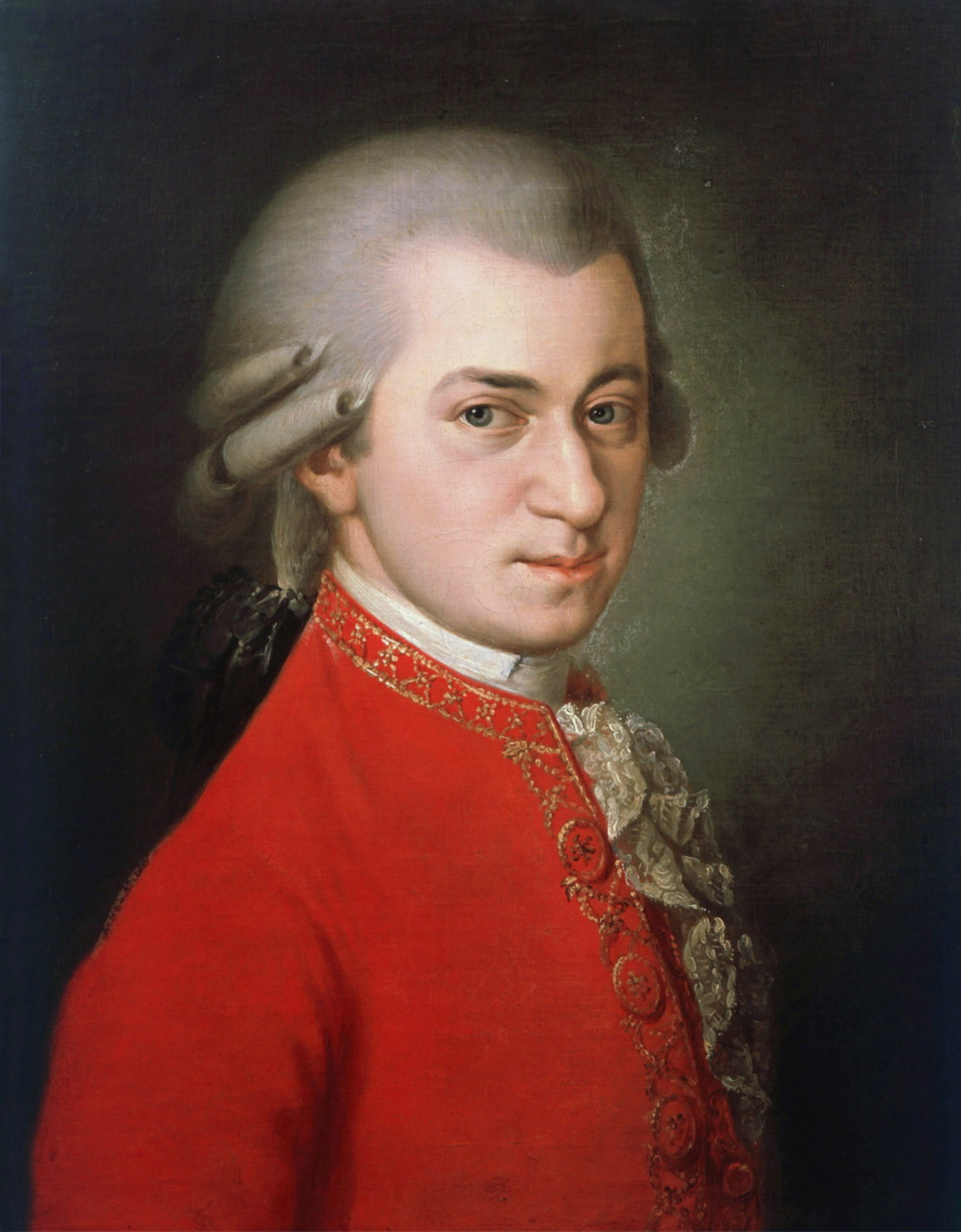
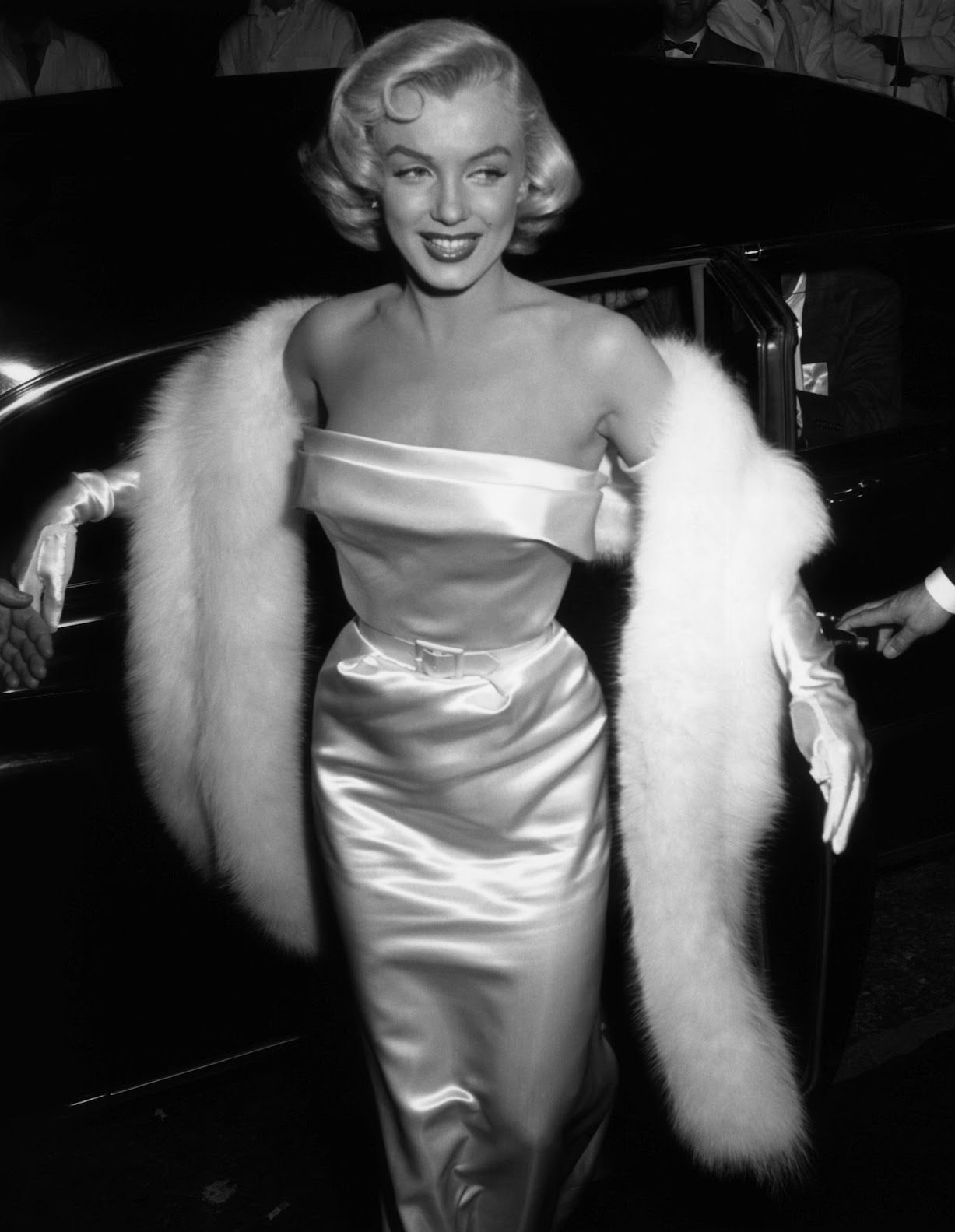
Many individuals—from Classical composers like Mozart to cinema stars like Marilyn Monroe—have been credited as pop icons.

A pop icon is a celebrity, character, or object whose exposure in popular culture is regarded as constituting a defining characteristic of a given society or era. The usage of the term is largely subjective since there are no definitively objective criteria. The categorization is usually associated with elements such as longevity, ubiquity and distinction. Moreover, "pop icon" status is distinguishable from other kinds of notability outside pop culture, such as with historic figures. Some historic figures are recognized as having reached "pop icon" status during their era, and such status may continue into the present. Pop icons of previous eras include Benjamin Franklin and Mozart.

== Attributes and origins ==
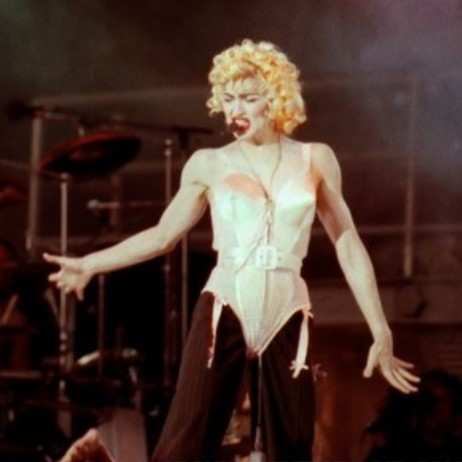
Semiotician Marcel Danesi attributed Madonna a catalyst role for the usage of the word "icon" in celebrity culture.

Historians Asa Briggs and Peter Burke, explained that term "iconography" would pass into high culture, and later in the twentieth century, into popular culture, where "icon" refers to a secular celebrity like Madonna. She probably had a catalyst role, as Marcel Danesi, a professor of semiotics and linguistic anthropology at the University of Toronto cited in Language, Society, and New Media: Sociolinguistics that the word "icon" is a "term of religious origin" and arguably "used for the first time in celebrity culture to describe the American pop singer Madonna". Danesi also asserts that the word "is now used in reference to any widely known celebrity, male or female". Some international reference works such as Oxford Advanced Learner's Dictionary and the Diccionario panhispánico de dudas have included Madonna's name to illustrate the new meaning of "icon". After The Advocate called her the "greatest gay icon", Guy Babineau from Xtra Magazine stated in 2008: "I'm old enough to remember when people weren't called icons".

=== Longevity ===
Usually, the pop icon status of a celebrity is contingent upon longevity of notoriety. This is in contrast to cult icons, whose notoriety or recognition may be limited to a specific subculture. Some pop icons have left a lasting and indelible mark in the area of their career, and then went on to attain a lasting place of recognition in society at large.

=== Ubiquity ===
A common element of pop icon status is the ubiquity of imagery and allusions to the iconic figure. (Note: Kaku, p. 11) It is common for the figure to be recognized and even celebrated in areas outside the original source of celebrity status. (Note: See e.g., Kaku, Chaplin, et al.) An example of this is Albert Einstein, a physicist whose image and legacy have been represented in comic strips, T-shirts, greeting cards and many other contexts.

== Distinction ==
Often pop icon status implies distinguished association with a societal ideal or archetype. It is not uncommon for iconic figures to have a nickname or sobriquet that is used to emphasize this association. Sometimes the very name of such individuals is even used as a synonym for common words or ideas.

Some fictional characters, such as Mickey Mouse, Bugs Bunny, the Simpsons, Harry Potter, Goku, Sailor Moon, Alice, Woody, Buzz Lightyear, and Willy Wonka are regarded as pop icons. Even inanimate objects have been recognized as pop icons.

Some figures attain transitory or context-specific "pop icon" status for particular events that captivate public attention, such as in the case of the O. J. Simpson trial.

== See also ==
- Cultural icon
- Celebrity culture
- Popular culture
- Teen idol
- Art pop
- Honorific nicknames in popular music
