= Franz Karl Stanzel =

Austrian literary theorist (1923–2023)

Franz Karl Stanzel (4 August 1923 – 17 October 2023) was an Austrian literary theorist who specialised in English literature.

== Academia ==
Born in Molln, Austria, Stanzel finished his degree with Herbert Koziol in Graz. After his habilitation in 1955, he was professor in Göttingen. In 1959, he was offered a position as professor (Ordinariat) in Erlangen. In 1962, he succeeded Koziol in Graz. He was a professor emeritus of English literature at the Karl-Franzens-Universität Graz.

== Scholarship ==
From the 1950s, Stanzel worked on an analytical topology for the description of the narrative mode, also often called "narrative situation" or "point of view" of narrative texts. Despite much criticism, his typological circle of three narrative situations is still taught in introductions to German literary studies at German universities (e. g. the introductions of the famous literary scholar Ansgar Nünning). From the late 1990s, there was a stronger competition by the narrative model of the French narratologist Gérard Genette in Germany.

Stanzel's typological circle featuring "three typical narrative situations", which describes various possibilities of structuring the mediacity of narrative, is based on three elements. These are "mode", "person" and "perspective", which can be divided further into the oppositions "narrator/reflector", "first person/third person" and "internal perspective/external perspective". Thus, Stanzel distinguishes three narrative situations: The "authorial narrative situation" is characterized by the dominance of the external perspective. In the "first-person narrative situation", the events are related by a "narrating I" who takes part in the action in the fictional world as a character or as the "experiencing I". "The figural narrative situation" is marked by the dominance of the reflector mode, restricting to a factual representation or using internal focalisation to create the impression of immediacy.

== Death ==
Stanzel died on 17 October 2023, at the age of 100.

== Selected works ==
- Stanzel, Franz K. (1953). Article on Faulkner's short story ‘The Bear‘. In: Die Neueren Sprachen. Zeitschrift für Forschung und Unterricht auf dem Fachgebiet der modernen Fremdsprachen. Jg. 1953, pag. 115. Frankfurt am Main.
- Stanzel, F.K. (1954). "Tom Jones and Tristram Shandy, Ein Vergleich als Vorstudie zu einer Typologie des Romans." English Miscellany 5 of Mario Praz.
- Stanzel, F.K. (1971, 1955). Narrative Situations in the Novel. Trans. James P. Pusack. Indiana University Press. Original title: Die typischen Erzählsituationen im Roman.
- Stanzel, F.K. (1976. 8. Auflage, 1964). Typische Formen des Romans. Vandenhoeck & Ruprecht, Göttingen.
- Stanzel, F.K. (1986, first paperback edition, 1979). A Theory of Narrative. Translated by Charlotte Goedsche. University of Cambridge. Original title: Theorie des Erzählens.
- Stanzel, F.K. (2002). Unterwegs. Erzähltheorie für Leser. Vandenhoeck & Ruprecht, Göttingen.
- Stanzel, F.K. (2011). Welt als Text. Grundbegriffe der Interpretation. Königshausen & Neumann GmbH, Würzburg.
- Stanzel, F.K. (2015). Die Typischen Erzählsituationen 1955 – 2015. Erfolgsgeschichte einer Triade. Königshausen & Neumann GmbH, Würzburg.
