= Herbert Penzl =

Australian-born philologist and historical linguist

Herbert Penzl (September 2, 1910 in Neufelden, Austria – September 1, 1995 in Oakland, California), was an Austrian-born American philologist and historical linguist. He studied English Philology under Karl Luick at the University of Vienna where he completed his Ph.D. dissertation The Development of Middle English a in New England Speech (1934). He spent some time in the United States working as an editorial assistant to Hans Kurath on the Linguistic Atlas of the United States and Canada at Brown University, having been recommended for the exchange by Sigmund Freud. While in the United States, he published his first article, "New England Terms for Poached Eggs," which received media coverage by the Associated Press among others.

After a brief return to Austria, he moved to the United States permanently in 1936. He was appointed at Rockford College, Illinois (1936–1938). In 1938, he received an appointment at the University of Illinois, where he worked until 1950. In 1944 he became a naturalized US citizen and from 1943 to 1945 he served in the United States Army, working on the development of military dictionaries.

After the war, he worked on the publication of A Grammar of Pashto: A Descriptive Study of the Dialect of Kandahar, Afghanistan (1955) after residing for one year on a Fulbright Program study grant (1948–49) in Afghanistan. From 1950 to 1963, he taught at the University of Michigan. In 1963, he received an offer from the Linguistics Department at the University of California, Berkeley, where he spent the remainder of his academic career.

Penzl's research included a wide variety of topics, but his main interests were Germanic historical phonology. He wrote over 250 research articles and published 11 books, many of which have become standard works for students of Germanic Philology. Penzl described himself as an "American-style Structuralist."

== Books (selected) ==
- The Development of Middle English /a/ in New England Speech. Dissertation, University of Vienna, 1935.
- A Grammar of Pashto A Descriptive Study of the Dialect of Kandahar, Afghanistan. Washington, DC: American Council of Learned Societies, 1955 ISBN 0-923891-72-2
- Methoden der germanischen Linguistik. Tübingen: Niemeyer, 1974 ISBN 9783484600287
- Lautsystem Und Lautwandel in den Althochdeutschen Dialekten (1971)
- Vom Urgermanischen zum Neuhochdeutschen: Eine historische Phonologie. Berlin: Erich Schmidt Verlag, 1975 ISBN 9783503007905
- Althochdeutsch: Eine Einführung in Dialekte und Vorgeschichte (1986) ISBN 9783261040589
- Mittelhochdeutsch: Eine Einführung in die Dialekte. Bern, Frankfurt a. M., New York, and Paris: Peter Lang, 1989. ISBN 9783261038531
- Probleme der historischen Phonologie (Steiner Wiesbaden) ISBN 9783533031611

== Honours ==
- Honorary Member of the Austrian Academy of Sciences (1991)
- Festschrift edited by I. Rauch and G. Carr: Linguistic Method: Essays in Honor of Herbert Penzl (Janua Linguarum, Series Major 79). The Hague: Mouton, 1979; 2018 ISBN 9789027977670

== Notable students ==
- Laurel J. Brinton (born 1953, UBC Vancouver)
- James W. Marchand (1926-2021, University of Illinois)
- Irmengard Rauch (1933-2025, UC Berkeley)
