= Augusto Ponzio =

Italian semiologist and philosopher (born 1942)

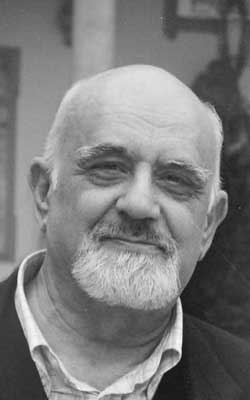
- Born: 17 February 1942 (age 83); San Pietro Vernotico, Apulia, Italy

Philosophical work
- Era: 20th / 21st-century philosophy
- Region: Western philosophy
- School: Semiotics
- Main interests: Philosophy of language

Augusto Ponzio (born 17 February 1942) is an Italian semiologist and philosopher.

Since 1980 is Full Professor of Philosophy of Language at Bari University, Italy and since 2015 is Professor Emeritus at the same university.

He has made a significant contribution as editor and translator to the dissemination of the ideas of Pietro Ispano, Mikhail Bakhtin, Emmanuel Lévinas, Karl Marx, Ferruccio Rossi-Landi, Adam Schaff and Thomas Albert Sebeok, in Italy and abroad.

== Biography ==
Augusto Ponzio has authored the first monographs ever at a world level on each of Emmanuel Lévinas, Mikhail Bakhtin and Adam Schaff : respectively, La relation interpersonal, 1967, dedicated to Levinas, Michail Bachtin. Alle origini della semiotic sovietica, 1980, and Persona umana, linguaggio e conoscenza in Adam Schaff, 1977. Each of these monographs has been translated and reworked over the years and presented in new enlarged editions.

He has promoted the Italian translation of numerous works by Mikhail Bakhtin and members of the Bakhtin Circle, including Valentin N. Voloshinov and Pavel N. Medvedev, but also the biologist I. I. Kanaev.

Augusto Ponzio has also contributed to Karl Marx studies in Italy and in 1975 published the Italian edition of his Mathematical Manuscripts.

Moreover, Ponzio has contributed significantly to the dissemination of Thomas Sebeok's work in Italy and of his global semiotics in particular. He has promoted the Italian translation of most of his books and has authored two monographs dedicated to his thought: Sebeok and the Signs of Life, published in 2001, and I segni e la vita. La semiotic globale di Thomas A. Sebeok, 2002.

Among Italian scholars Ponzio has focused particularly on the work of his master Giuseppe Semerari, on the semiotician Ferruccio Rossi-Landi and philosopher of language Giovanni Vailati.

At Bari University Ponzio has been teaching:

- Theoretical Philosophy and Moral Philosophy since 1966;
- Philosophy of language since 1970;
- Semiotics from 1995 to 1997;
- Text Semiotics from 1997 to 2001;
- Communication Theory from 1995 to 1998;
- General Linguistics and Semiotics of mass media since 1998;

From 1981 to 1999 Ponzio directed the Institute of Philosophy of Language, which he founded at the Faculty of Foreign Literature and Languages, in 1981. From 1999 to 2005 he acted as Head of the Department of Linguistic Practices and Text Analysis, which he founded in 1999. He directs the Doctoral Program in Language Theory and Sign Sciences, which he inaugurated in 1988.

With Claude Gandelman (University of Haifa), in 1989 he founded the annual book series Athanor. Arte, Letteratura, Semiotica, Filosofia of which now he directs the new series inaugurated with Meltemi publishers in Rome, in 1998. Athanor: this Arabic word evokes the alchemist in the laboratory mixing and transforming the elements.

== Works ==
from these authors I have developed what they share in spite of their differences, that is, the idea that the life of the human individual in his/her concrete singularity, whatever the object of study, and however specialized the analysis, cannot prescind from involvement without alibis in the destiny of others.

— Augusto Ponzio

His principal research areas include philosophy of language, general linguistics, semiotics, and theory of literature.

The expression "philosophy of language" conveys the scope and orientation of his research as he addresses problems of semiotics from the perspective of philosophy of language, updated with references to the latest developments in the sign sciences, from linguistics to biosemiotics. As such his approach may be more properly described as pertaining to general semiotics.

Nonetheless, Ponzio practices general semiotics in terms of critique and the search for foundations, which derives from his work in philosophy of language. As critique of semiotics Ponzio's general semiotics overcomes the delusory separation between the humanities, on the one hand, and the logico-mathematical and the natural sciences, on the other.

His semiotic research relates to different disciplines proposing an approach that is transversal and interdisciplinary, or better, as he prefers to say, an approach that is ‘undisciplined’. Moreover, general semiotics as conceived by Ponzio against such a background continues its philosophical search for sense. This perspective evidences the interconnectedness of the sciences.

And most significantly the problem of their sense for the human being is also addressed.

== Bibliography ==
The following texts are in Italian, unless otherwise specified.

=== Research monographs ===
- La relazione interpersonale, Adriatica Editrice, Bari, 1967, 105 pp.
  - (2° ed.) Soggetto e alterità. Da Lévinas a Lévinas, Adriatica Ed., Bari, 1983, 174 pp.
  - (3° ed.) Soggetto e alterità. Da Lévinas a Lévinas. con un’intervista a Lévinas, Adriatica Editrice, Bari, 1989.
- Linguaggio e relazioni sociali, Adriatica Editrice, Bari, 1970, 204 pp.
  - (2° ed.) Linguaggio e relazioni sociali, Bari, Graphis, 2006, 126 pp.
- Produzione linguistica e ideologia sociale, De Donato, Bari, 1973, 256 pp.
  - (in Spanish) Produccion linguistica e ideologia social, Corazon Editor, Madrid, 1974, 294 pp.;
  - Jezicna proizvodnja i drustvena ideologija, Skolska knjiga, Zagabria, 1978, 236 pp.;
  - (in English) Production linguistique et idéologie sociale, Editions Balzac, Candiac (Canada) 1992, 318 pp.
  - (2° ed.) Produzione linguistica e ideologia sociale, Bari, Graphis, 2006.
- Persona umana, linguaggio e withoscenza in Adam Schaff, Dedalo, Bari, 1974, 184 pp.
- Filosofia del linguaggio e prassi sociale, Milella, Lecce, 1974, 262 pp.
- Gramática transformacional e ideología política, Nueva Vision, Buenos Aires, 1974, 116 pp.
- Dialettica e verità. Scienza e materialismo storico-dialettico, Dedalo, Bari, 1975, 126 pp.
- La semiotica in Italia. Fondamenti teorici, Dedalo, Bari, 1976, 136 pp. + antologia, pp. 137–538.
- Marxismo, scienza e problema dell’uomo. with un’intervista ad Adam Schaff, Bertani, Verona, 1977, 270 pp.
- Scuola e plurilinguismo (with G. Mininni), Dedalo, Bari, 1980, pp. 5–84.
- Michail Bachtin. Alle origini della semiotica sovietica, Dedalo, Bari, 1980, 230 pp.
- Segni e withtraddizioni. Fra Marx e Bachtin, Bertani, Verona, 1981, 258 pp.
- Spostamenti, Percorsi e discorsi sul segno, Adriatica Editrice, Bari, 1982, 142 pp.
- Lo spreco dei significanti. L’eros, la morte, la scrittura, (with M. G. Tundo e E. Paulicelli), Adriatica Editrice, Bari, 1983, pp. 7–120.
- Fra linguaggio e letteratura, Adriatica Editrice, Bari, 1983, 156 pp.
- (in Italian and English) Per parlare dei segni. Talking About Signs (with M. A. Bonfantini e G. Mininni), Adriatica, Bari, 1985, pp. 7–145.
- Filosofia del linguaggio, Adriatica Editrice, Bari, 1985, 226 pp.
- Interpretazione e scrittura. Scienza dei segni ed eccedenza letteraria, Bertani, Verona, 1986, 152 pp.
- Dialogo sui dialoghi (with M. A. Bonfantini), Longo, Ravenna, 1986, 198 pp.
- Ferruccio Rossi-Landi e la filosofia del linguaggio, Adriatica Editrice, Bari, 1988, 348 pp.
- Il filosofo e la tartaruga. Scritti 1983-1989, Ravenna, Longo, 1989, 134 pp.
- (in English) Man as a Sign, Mouton de Gruyter, Berlino - New York, 1990, 412 pp.
- Filosofia del linguaggio 2. Segni valori ideologie, Adriatica editrice, Bari, 1991, 224 pp.
- Dialogo e narrazione, Milella, Lecce, 1991, 65 pp.
- Tra semiotica e letteratura. Introduzione a Michail Bachtin, Bompiani, Milano, 1992, 232 pp.
  - (2° ed.) Tra semiotica e letteratura. Introduzione a Michail Bachtin, Milano, Bompiani, 2003, lXXV + 232 pp.
- La ricerca semiotica (with Omar Calabrese and S. Petrilli), Bologna, Esculapio, 1993, 290 pp.
- (in English) Signs Dialogue and Ideology, (raccolta di saggi a cura di S. Petrilli), John Benjamins, Amsterdam 1993, 1986 pp.
- Il dialogo della menzogna (with M. A. Bonfantini), Roma, Stampa alternativa, 1993, 32 pp.
- Scrittura, dialogo e alterità. Tra Bachtin e Lévinas, La Nuova Italia, Firenze, 1994, pp. 264 pp.
- Fondamenti di filosofia del linguaggio (with P. Calefato and S. Petrilli), Laterza, Manuali, Roma-Bari, 1994, 362 pp.
  - (2° ed.) Fondamenti di filosofia del linguaggio (with P. Calefato and S. Petrilli), Laterza, Manuali, Roma-Bari, 1999, 362 pp.
  - (in Portuguese) Fundamentos da Filosofia da linguagem, di E F. Alves, with una Introduzione di A. Ponzio pp. 9–68, Petrópolis (Brasile), 2007, 388 pp. ISBN 978-85-326-3499-3.
- Responsabilità e alterità in Emmanuel Lévinas, Jaca Book, Milano, 1995, 166 pp.
- La differenza non indifferente. Comunicazione, migrazione, guerra, Mimesis, Milano, 1995, 203 pp.
  - (2° ed.) La differenza non indifferente. Comunicazione, migrazione, Guerra, Milano, Mimesis, 2002, 204 pp.
- (in Spanish) El juego del comunicar. Entre literatura y filosofía, a cura di Mercedes Arriaga Flórez, Episteme, Valencia, 1995, 144 pp.
- Segni per parlare dei segni. Signs to talk about signs, Adriatica Editrice, Bari, 1995, 174 pp.
- I segni dell’altro. Eccedenza letteraria e prossimità, Edizioni Scientifiche Italiane, Napoli, 1995, 266 pp.
- (in French) Sujet et altérité. Sur Emmanuel Lévinas, L’Harmattan, Paris, 1995, 160 pp.
- I ricordi, la memoria, l’oblio. Foto-grafie senza soggetto (with Gabriella Pranzo), Bari, Edizioni dal Sud, 1995, 102 pp.
- Comunicazione, comunità, informazione. Comunicazione mondializzata e nuove tecnologie (with M. A. Bonfantini, P. Calefato, C. Caputo, P. Mazzotta, S. Petrilli, M. Refice), Manni Editore, Lecce, 1996, 224 pp.
- I tre dialoghi della menzogna e della verità (with M. A. Bonfantini e S. Petrilli), Edizioni Scientifiche Italiane, Napoli, 1996, 130 pp.
- La rivoluzione bachtiniana. Il pensiero di Bachtin e l’ideologia withtemporanea, Levante Editori, Bari, 1997, 358 pp.
- Metodologia della formazione linguistica, Laterza, Manuali, Roma-Bari, 1997, 450 pp.
- Che cos’è la letteratura? Otto questioni dialogando with Carlo Alberto Augieri, Milella, Lecce, 1997, 90 pp.
- Elogio dell'infunzionale. Critica dell'ideologia della produttività, Castelvecchi, Roma, 1997, 206 pp.
  - (2° ed.) Elogio dell’infunzionale (riveduta e ampliata), Milano, Mimesis, 2004
- Semiotica della musica. Introduzione al linguaggio musicale (with M. Lomuto), Graphis, Bari, 1997. 188 pp.
- La coda dell'occhio. Letture del linguaggio letterario, Graphis, Bari, 1998, 184 pp.
- (in Spanish) La revolución bajtiniana. El pensamiento de Bajtin y la ideologia withtempoanea, Catedra, Madrid, 1998,
- (in English) Signs of research on Signs (with S. Petrilli), fascicolo speciale di "Semiotische Berichte", 22/ 3,4, (Vienna) 1998, 184 pp.
- Basi. Significare, inventare, dialogare (with M. A. Bonfantini, C. Caputo, S. Petrilli, Thomas A. Sebeok), Lecce, Piero Manni, 1998, 394 pp.
- La comunicazione, Graphis, Bari, 1999.
  - (2° ed.) La comunicazione, Bari, Graphis 2006, 202 pp. ISBN 88-86864-27-2.
- Fuori campo. I segni del corpo tra rappresentazione ed eccedenza (with S. Petrilli), Mimesis, Milano, 1999.
- Il sentire nella comunicazione globale (with S. Petrilli), Meltemi, Roma, 2000.
- (in English) Philosophy of Language, Art and Answerability in Mikhail Bakhtin (in collab. with S. Petrilli), Legas, New York, Ottawa, Toronto, 2000, 52 pp.
- Semiotica dell'io (with Thomas A. Sebeok e S. Petrilli) Meltemi, Roma, 2001 pp.
- (in English) Thomas Sebeok and the Signs of Life (with Thomas A. Sebeok e S. Petrilli), Iwith Books UK, Totem Books USA, Cambridge, 2001, 78 pp.
- Enunciazione e testo letteraio nell’insegnamento dell’italiano come LS, Edizioni Guerra, Perugia, 2001, 184 pp.
  - (2° ed.) Enunciazione e testo letterario nell’insegnamento dell’italiano come LS, Edizioni Guerra, Perugia, 2010, 168 pp. ISBN 978-88-557-0340-6.
- I segni e la vita la semiotica globale di Thomas A. Sebeok (with S. Petrilli) Spirali, Milano, 2001, 264 pp.
- Individuo umano, linguaggio e globalizzazione nella filosofia di Adam Schaff. with una intervista ad Adam Schaff, Milano, Mimesis, 2002.
- Il linguaggio e le lingue. Introduzione alla linguistica generale, Bari, Graphis, 2002, 200 pp.
  - (2° ed.) Il linguaggio e le lingue, Bari, Graphis 2008.
  - (3° ed.) Il linguaggio e le lingue, Bari, Graphis, 2010.
- I segni tra globalità e infinità. Per la critica della comunicazione globale, Bari, Cacucci, 2003, 214 pp.
- Semioetica (with S. Petrilli), Roma, Meltemi, 2003, 192 pp.
- (in English) Views in Literary Semiotics (with S. Petrilli), Ottawa, Legas, 2003, 141 pp.
- Linguistica generale, scrittura letteraria e traduzione, Perugia, Guerra, 2004, 444 pp.
  - (2° ed.) Linguistica generale, scrittura letteraria e traduzione, Perugia, Guerra, 2007, 444 pp. ISBN 978-88-7715-983-0
- Semiotica e dialettica, Bari, Edizioni dal Sud, 2004, 296 pp.
- La raffigurazione letteraria (with S. Petrilli), Milano, Mimesis, 2005, 300 pp.
- Semiotica globale. Il corpo nel segno: introduzione a Thomas A. Sebeok (with Marcell danesi e S. Petrilli), Bari, Graphis, 2004, 140 pp.
- Testo come ipertesto e traduzione letteraria, Rimini, Guaraldi, 2005, 116 pp.
- (in English) Reasoning with Emmanuel Lévinas (with S. Petrilli e Julia Ponzio). Ottawa, Legas, 2005, 54 pp.
- (in English) Semiotics Unbounded. Interpretive Routes in the Open Network of Signs (with S. Petrilli), Toronto, Toronto University Press, 2005, 630 pp.
- (in English) Semiotic Animal (with S. Petrilli e [J. Deely]), Toronto, Legas, 2005, 244 pp.
- Tesi per il futuro anteriore della semiotica. Il programma di ricerca della Scuola di Bari-Lecce, (with C. Caputo and S. Petrilli), Milano, Mimesi, 2006, 136. pp.
- Dialoghi semiotici with M. A. Bonfantini e S. Petrilli, Napoli, Edizioni Scientifiche Italiane, 2006.
- (in English) The Dialogic Nature of Sign, Ottawa, Legas, 2006, 56 pp.
- La cifrematica e l’ascolto, Bari, Graphis, 2006, 178 pp.
  - (2° ed.) La cifrematica e l’ascolto, Bari, Graphis, 2008, 178 pp. ISBN 978-88-7581-064-1.
- Fuori luogo. L’esorbitante nella riproduzione dell’identico, Roma, Meltemi, 2007, 335 pp. ISBN 978-88-8353-571-0.
- A mente. Processi cognitivi e formazione linguistica, Perugia, Guerra Edizioni, 2007, 172 pp. ISBN 978-88-557-0032-0.
- Semiotics Today. From Global Semiotics to Semioethics, a Dialogic Response (with S. Petrilli), New York, Ottawa, Toronto, Legas, 2007, 84 pp. ISBN 978-1-894508-98-8
- Lineamenti di semiotica e di filosofia del linguaggio, (with S. Petrilli), Bari, Graphis, 2008, 380 pp. ISBN 978-88-7581-106-8.
- Tre sguardi su Auguste Dupin (with M. A. Bonfantini e B. Brunetti), Bari, Graphis, 2008, 88 pp. ISBN 978-88-7581-101-3.
- Tra Bachtin e Lévinas. Scrittura, dialogo, alterità, Bari, Palomar 2008, 440 pp. ISBN 978-88-7600-294-6.
- Linguaggio, lavoro e mercato globale. Rileggendo Rossi-Landi, Milano, Mimesis, 2008, 190 pp. ISBN 978-88-8483-702-8
- La dissidenza cifrematica, Milano, Spirali, 2008, 268 pp. ISBN 978-88-7770-851-9.
- A revolusão bakhtiniana, San Paolo (Brasile), withtexto, 320 pp. ISBN 978-85-7244-409-5.
- Da dove verso dove. La parola altra nella comunicazione globale, Perugia, Edizioni Guerra, 2009, 160 pp.
- (in French) L’écoute de l’autre, Parigi, L’Harmattan 2009, 116 pp. ISBN 978-2-296-09619-6.
- (in English) Emmanuel Levinas, Globalisation, and Preventive Peace, Legas, Ottawa, 2009, 56 pp. 976. ISBN 978-1-897493-09-0
- Roland Barthes. La visione ottusa (with J. Ponzio, G. Mininni, S. Petrilli, L. Ponzio, M. Solimini), Milano, Mimesis, 2010, ISBN 978-88-575-0107-9.
- (in French) Renwithtres de paroles, Parigi, Alain Baudry & Cie, 2009, ISBN 978-2-35755-042-1.
- Freud, l'analisi, la scrittura (with M. A. Bonfantini, Bruno Brunetti), Bari, Graphis, 2010, ISBN 978-88-7581-132-7.
- (in Portuguese) Enwithtres de palavras. O outro no discurso, Pedro e João Editores, San Carlos (Brasile), 2010.
- (in Portuguese) Procurando uma palavra outra, Pedro e João Editores, San Carlos (Brasile), 2010, ISBN 978-85-7993-026-3.
- Interpretazione e scrittura, Scienza dei testi ed eccedenza letteraria, Pensa Multimedia, Lecce, 2011.
- In altre parole, Mimesis, Milano, 2011.
- La filosofia del linguaggio, Edizioni Laterza, Bari, 2011.

=== On his scientific research ===
- Bibliografia e letture critiche, Bari, Edizioni dal Sud, 1992, 1995, 2002.
- P. Calefato e S. Petrilli (ed.) Logica, dialogica, ideologica. I segni tra funzionalità ed eccedenza, introd., Semiosi, infunzionalità, semiotica, pp. 11–17, Milano, Mimesis, 2003.
- (in English) S. Petrilli (ed.) Ideology, Logic, and Dialogue in Semioethic Perspective. in Semiotica. Journal of the International Association for Semiotic Studies, 148-1/4, 2004.
- (in English) Susan Petrilli, Semiotic profile: Augusto Ponzio. A Portrait of the Semiotician and Philosopher of Language on the Occasion of his 40th year of teaching, in Semiotix 5, "Semioticon". Archived from the original on 14 September 2011., 2005.
- (in English) The I Questioned: Emmanuel Levinas and the critique of Occidental reason, Subject Matters, special edition, vol. 3, 1, 2006.
- (in English) Susan Petrilli (ed.) La filosofia del linguaggio come arte dell'ascolto / philosophy of Language as the Art of Listening, Sulla ricerca scientifica di Augusto Ponzio, Bari, Edizioni dal Sud, 2007. inside:
  - (in English) Paul Cobley, A brief note on dialogue.
  - (in English) Vincent Colapietro, In the name of that which has been desecrated.
  - (in English) Eero Tarasti, The right to unfunctionality – explorations in Augusto Ponzio's philosophical semiotics.
  - (in English) Marcel Danesi, Augusto Ponzio: A brief note on the “Italian Bakhtin”.
  - (in English) Kalevi Kull, Biosemiotic conversations: Ponzio, Bakhtin, Kanaev, Driesch, Uexküll, Lotman.
  - (in English) Floyd Merrell, The sign's significant other.
  - Loreta de Stasio, Lingua e letteratura, conoscenza e coscienza.
  - (in English) Winfried Nöth and Lucia Santaella, Otherness at the roots of cultural semiosis.
  - Giuseppe Mininni, Identità e alterità nella dinamica della coscienza storica.
  - Cosimo Caputo, Tutto il segnico umano è linguaggio.
  - (in English) John Deely, The primary modeling system in animals.
  - Carlo Augieri, Per Qohélet emigrato nel Sud è la vanità ad essere “nienzi”: “dentro” il dialetto è straniera la parola dei re.
  - (in English) Frank Nuessel, “Virtual” Augusto Ponzio''.
  - Mario Signore, Dal silenzio primordiale al brusio della parola. Alla ricerca della parola “vissuta”.
  - (in Spanish) José Maria Nadal, Sobre el enunciador implícito en Augusto Ponzio.
  - (in English) Genevieve Vaughan, Giving and receiving signs.
  - (in English) Jeff Bernard, Ferruccio Rossi-Landi and a short history of the Rossi-Landi Network.
  - (in English) Susan Petrilli, Reading Augusto Ponzio, master of signs and languages.
  - Nicolas Bonnet, Augusto.
- S. Petrilli, Tutt’altro. Infunzionalità ed eccedenza come prerogative dell’umano, Milano, Mimesis, 2008.
- (in English) Paul Cobley, Augusto Ponzio, pp. 291–292, in Paul Cobley (ed.), The Routledge Companion to Semiotics, London, Routledge, 2010.
