= David Savan =

David Savan (1916 – 1992) was an eminent semiotician and Charles Sanders Peirce scholar. His works were focused on epistemological questions and Baruch Spinoza's philosophy of language.

He was a Professor in the University of Toronto, Philosophy Department, 1943–1981. When he joined the faculty, Savan was immediately noted for evaluating George Sidney Brett's fourth-year modern philosophy course.

He was the first recipient of the Thomas A. Sebeok fellowship.

Savan has influenced several modern philosophers. These include Jean Fisette and his attempt to understand clinical data that are associated with the pathology of both linguistic and narrative competencies. His positions, however, also have their own critics. For instance, his notion of Ground and his interpretation of sign as a single concept have been challenged by T.L. Short.
