= John of St. Thomas =

Portuguese philosopher (1589–1644)

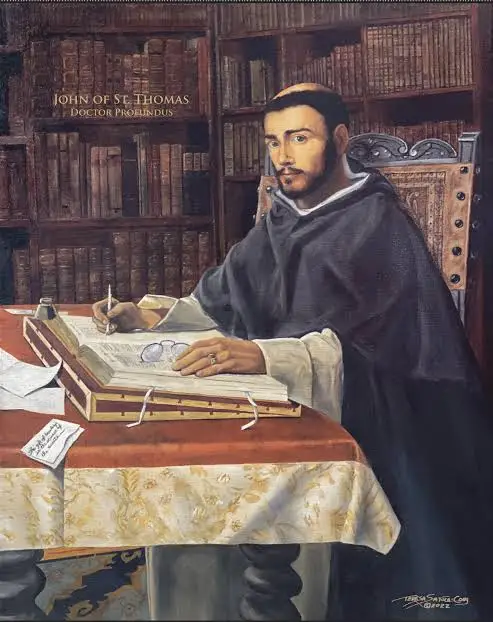
- Born: João Poinsot; 9 July 1589; Lisbon, Portugal
- Died: 17 June 1644; Fraga, Spain
- Education: University of Coimbra; University of Louvain
- Occupations: Friar, philosopher, theologian
- Writing career
- Subjects: Metaphysics, logic, epistemology, ethics, political philosophy, semiotics
- Notable work: Tractatus de Signis
- Literary movement: Scholasticism, Thomism

John of St. Thomas O.P., born João Poinsot (also called John Poinsot in English; 9 July 1589 – 15 June 1644), was a Portuguese Dominican friar, Thomist theologian, and professor of philosophy. He is known for being an early theorist in the field of semiotics.

== Biography ==
Born of noble parentage to a Portuguese mother and a father likely of Belgian descent employed by Albert of Austria. He was then sent early to the University of Coimbra, a university under the Jesuits and worked under Thomas de Torres de Madrid. He displayed talents of the first order, completed his humanities and philosophy, and obtained the degree of Master of Arts. He then entered the University of Louvain. Here, too, he showed remarkable ability, and earned the title of Bachelor of Theology at an early age. His admiration for St. Thomas proved to be a determining motive of his, which led to him joining the Dominican Order at Madrid in 1612 when he was 23 years old, taking the name of John of St. Thomas, by which he is known to history. Immediately after his novitiate, he began teaching his younger religious confrers as professor of philosophy and theology at the University of Alcalá. He soon took rank among the most learned men of the time, and was placed successively (1630 and 1640) in charge of the two principal chairs of theology in the university of that city. His renown drew the largest number of scholars that had ever attended its theological faculties. He taught for 33 years

No man enjoyed a greater reputation in Spain, or was more frequently consulted on points of doctrine and ecclesiastical matters. His theological and philosophical writings, which have gone through many editions, are among the best expositions of Thomas Aquinas's doctrine, of which he is acknowledged to be one of the foremost interpreters. Though he took an active part in the scholastic discussions of his times, his courtesy was such that he is said never to have hurt an opponent's feelings. So faithful was he to the traditions of his order and the principles of the Angelic Doctor that in his last illness he could declare that, in all the thirty years he had devoted to teaching and writing, he had not taught or written anything contrary to St. Thomas. His humility and his devotion to education caused him to refuse many dignities offered him by the Church and his order. In 1643 Philip IV offered him the office of royal confessor, a position which only religious obedience could induce him to accept. His writings comprise: Cursus philosophicus Thomisticus (9 vols.); Cursus Theologici (9 vols.), which is a commentary on the Summa Theologica of St. Thomas; Tractatus de Approbatione, Auctoritate, et Puritate Doctrinae D. Thomae Aquinatis; A Compendium of Christian Doctrine (in Spanish); and A Treatise on a Happy Death (in Spanish), written at the command of Philip IV. He caught a fever and died in Fraga, Spain at the age of 55.

== Works ==
- Ioannes a S. Thoma, O. P. (1883). Cursus philosophicus Thomisticus (in Latin). Paris: Ludovicus Vivès. OCLC 7132509. Volumes 1, 2, and 3 available gratis online.
- Ioannes a S. Thoma, O. P. (1931–1964). Cursus theologici (in Latin). Paris, Rome: Desclée. OCLC 18001569. Volumes 1, 2, and 3 available gratis online.
- John of St. Thomas (2004). Introduction to the Summa Theologiae of Thomas Aquinas: The Isagogue of John of St. Thomas. Trans. McInerny, Ralph. South Bend, Ind.: St. Augustine's Press. OCLC 46928729.
- John of St. Thomas; Cuddy, Cajetan; Farrell, Walter; Hughes, Dominic (2016). The Gifts of the Holy Spirit. Tacoma, WA: Cluny Media. ISBN 978-1-944418-22-9.
- Poinsot, John (1985) [1632]. Tractatus de Signis. The Semiotic of John Poinsot. Trans. Deely, John. Berkeley: California University Press. OCLC 277224194.

== Sources ==
- Hughes, D. (2003). "John of St. Thomas". In Marthaler, B. L. (ed.). New Catholic Encyclopedia. Vol. 7: Hol–Jub (2nd ed.). Detroit: Thomson Gale. pp. 983–984.
