= Herbert Schendl =

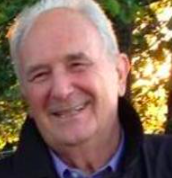
Herbert Schendl 2014

Herbert Schendl (Ph.D. 1971 University of Vienna, "Habilitation" 1985 University of Vienna, "Ao. Univ.-Prof" 1986, "O. Univ.-Prof." 1992 University of Vienna) is professor and chair emeritus for English historical linguistics at the department of English and American studies at the University of Vienna. He has been the fourth "Luick"-Chair and a major proponent of the Vienna School of English Historical Linguistics (a position that since Schendl's retirement in 2007 has been held by Nikolaus Ritt as the fifth such chair).

Schendl's work spans from Old English to Late Modern English, though his interests include present-day varieties and, not insignificantly, Austrian German (a passion he shares with Karl Luick). He incorporates sociohistorical approaches, e.g., Schendl (1996, 1997, 2012). Presently, Schendl is teaching courses on Old English at the department of English and American studies in Vienna.

Schendl was an innovator in the field of historical code-switching, an area he helped found and bring to prominence from the mid-1990s. His most popular monograph is his introductory book Historical Linguistics, which appeared in 2001 in Oxford University Press' series Oxford Introductions to Language Studies, edited by H. G. Widdowson, and has been translated into a number of languages, and has appeared in China with a Chinese foreword.

== Education and Academic Career ==
Herbert Schendl grew up, like Herbert Penzl, in Upper Austria and studied English and French Literature and Linguistics at the University of Vienna, originally towards a teachers' degree. From 1971 to 1974, he worked as an assistant professor at what is now the Vienna University of Economics and Business, before, in 1974, returning to his alma mater department as assistant professor. His "Habilitation" (second book) on verb valency in Old English was completed in 1985, followed by professorial positions in Vienna and, in 1992, a call as full professor to LMU Munich, which he declined, deciding to remain as Ordinarius at the University of Vienna.

== Academic philosophy and record ==
Schendl has been a member of the University Board of Governors ("Senat" in Austrian German), as the Dean's Committee Chair or as a member of the university-wide Arbitration Committee. His efforts have been recognized in a 2007 Festschrift on the occasion of his 65th birthday published by Braumüller, and a 2012 international symposium on the occasion of his 70th birthday (see Conferences).

== Austrian Studies in English ==
Herbert Schendl has been editor of Austrian Studies in English (ASE), currently with Sabine Coelsch-Foisner and Gabriella Mazzon. ASE is a book series originally founded in 1895 as Wiener Beiträge zur englischen Philologie and is one of the longest-running academic publication series in the world. Austrian Studies has been a major vehicle of publication for the Vienna School, publishing works by Jakob Schipper (1895), Karl Luick (1903), or Herbert Koziol (1967). Jakob Schipper, as the founding professor of the Vienna English Department in 1877, was also the series' first main editor. Over 105 volumes have appeared in the series, which has been published with Peter Lang since 2014.

== Conferences ==
In February 2012, the symposium "Studying Change in the History of English: New Directions in Linguistics" (SCHENDL) was held at the Department of English and American Studies at the University of Vienna (co-organised by the School of English at Birmingham City University). On February 24-25, several national and international scholars presented their research on historical English linguistics in honour of Herbert Schendl.
