= Roberta Kevelson =

- Born: Roberta Kahan; November 4, 1931; Fall River, Massachusetts
- Died: November 28, 1998 (aged 67); Williamsburg, Virginia
- Other name: Bobbie Kevelson
- Occupation: professor
- Known for: legal semiotics

Academic background
- Education: Brown University
- Thesis: (1978)
- Influences: Charles Sanders Peirce

Academic work
- Discipline: linguistics, semiotics
- Sub-discipline: legal semiotics
- Notable works: Peirce and the Mark of the Gryphon

Roberta "Bobbie" Kevelson (November 4, 1931 – November 28, 1998) was an American academic and semiotician. She was an acknowledged authority on the pragmatism theories of Charles Sanders Peirce.

== Personal life ==
Kevelson was born in Fall River, Massachusetts and graduated from B.M.C. Durfee High School in 1948. Although married at 17, she returned to college in the 1960s and received her PhD in semiotics from Brown University in 1978.

== Career ==
During her postdoctoral time at Yale University (1979–1981), she introduced the concept of legal semiotics. She subsequently established an international cross-disciplinary center for its study in 1984: the Center for Semiotic Research in Law, Government, and Economics at the Pennsylvania State University. She had joined the philosophy faculty of the Berks Campus at Penn State in 1981, where she was awarded the AMOCO Foundation Outstanding Teaching Award in 1986.

She was a visiting professor at several institutions, including The College of William & Mary, Virginia. Among her published works are High Fives, The Inverted Pyramid, The Law as the System of Signs and possibly her most significant work, Peirce and the Mark of the Gryphon. She was a founding member of the Semiotic Society of America.

== Works ==
Several works are included in the Charles Sanders Peirce bibliography.

- Kevelson, Roberta (1986), Charles S. Peirce's Method of Methods, John Benjamins Publishing Co. (February 1986), 180 pages, hardcover (ISBN 978-9027232892, ISBN 90-272-3289-X), JB catalog page.
- Kevelson, Roberta (1977). The Inverted Pyramid: An Introduction to a Semiotics of Media Language. Bloomington: Indiana University. ISBN 0-87750-203-X. OCLC 4069511.
- Kevelson, Roberta, ed. (1991), Peirce and Law: Issues in Pragmatism, Legal Realism, and Semiotics, Peter Lang Publishing Group, 225 pages, hardcover (ISBN 978-0-8204-1519-2), PLPG catalog page.
- Kevelson, Roberta (1993), Peirce's Esthetics of Freedom, Peter Lang Publishing Group, 360 pages, hardcover (ISBN 978-0-8204-1898-8), PLPG catalog page.
- Kevelson, Roberta (1996), Peirce, Science, Signs, Peter Lang Publishing Group, 206 pages, hardcover (ISBN 978-0-8204-3016-4), PLPG catalog page.
- Kevelson, Roberta (1998 April), Peirce's Pragmatism: The Medium as Method, Peter Lang Publishing Group, 204 pages, hardcover (ISBN 978-0-8204-3982-2), PLPG catalog page.
- Kevelson, Roberta (1999), Peirce and the Mark of the Gryphon, Palgrave, 239 pages, hardcover (ISBN 978-0312176945, ISBN 0-312-17694-5). Draws from unpublished Peirce manuscripts.
- Pencak, William; Lindgren, J. Ralph; Kevelson, Roberta, eds. (1998). New Approaches to Semiotics and the Human Sciences: Essays in Honor of Roberta Kevelson. New York: P. Lang. ISBN 0-8204-3814-6. OCLC 36663047.
