= Vincent Colapietro =

Vincent Colapietro is an adjunct professor of Humanities in the Department of Philosophy at the University of Rhode Island. His education includes a bachelor's degree from Saint Anselm College, a master's degree from Marquette University and a Ph.D. from Marquette University. While his principal area of historical research is classical American pragmatism (especially Peirce, James, and Dewey), he has wide and varied scholarly interests. They range from such literature, film, and music (above all, jazz) to semiotics, poststructuralism, and psychoanalysis, from social and political philosophy to philosophical and experimental psychology. He is the author of Peirce’s Approach to the Self, A Glossary of Semiotics, and Fateful Shapes of Human Freedom as well as scores of articles. The main focus of his current research is the intersections between pragmatism and psychoanalysis. His writings have been translated into a variety of languages, including French, Italian, Portuguese, Russian, Bulgarian, and Japanese. Chair of the Advisory Board of the Peirce Edition Project (the Project is responsible for producing a critical edition of Peirce's voluminous scientific and philosophical writings). Co-editor of the Journal of Speculative Philosophy. He is past president of the Metaphysical Society of America, the Semiotic Society of America, and the Charles S. Peirce Society, and served as a Liberal Arts Research Professor in the Department of Philosophy at Pennsylvania State University (University Park Campus)..
