= Marcel Danesi =

Italian linfuiar and academic

Marcel Danesi (born 1946) is Professor of Semiotics and Linguistic Anthropology at the University of Toronto. He is known for his work in language, communications and semiotics and is Director of the program in semiotics and communication theory. He has also held positions at Rutgers University (1972), University of Rome "La Sapienza" (1988), the Catholic University of Milan (1990) and the University of Lugano.

He is the former editor-in-chief of Semiotica, the official journal of the International Association for Semiotic Studies, and is a past-president of the Semiotic Society of America. Danesi regularly contributes to global discussions on semiotics and human behaviors with appearances including a discussion on kissing on The Deep Cover Show with Damien Dynan and the origins of puzzles in Best Health magazine.

== Publications ==
Danesi is the author of several books and his work has been featured in a range of mainstream publications such as The New York Times, The Guardian and The Globe and Mail.

His 2016 book, The Semiotics of Emoji, traces the use of emoji back to its anthropological and sociological roots. Reviewing the book in the journal Semiotica (of which Danesi himself has been editor-in-chief since 2004), Omonpee W. Petcoff wrote, "The author purposefully and masterfully presents semiotics principles and pedagogy in non-technical terms. The outcome is a text that, while rich in semiotics fundamentals and terminology, is also inviting, engaging, and, accordingly, accessible to diverse readers." In 2017, The Semiotics of Emoji was one of four books shortlisted for the annual British Association for Applied Linguistics Book Prize.

However, the book was found to be "riddled with elementary errors" and "shoddy citation practices" according to Internet linguist Gretchen McCulloch's review in the Canadian Journal of Linguistics. The details of her analysis are publicly available in the Twitter thread review she posted on her account in August 2018, on which the journal review was based.

== Bibliography ==
Selected publications:

- 1993 Vico, Metaphor, and the Origin of Language, Indiana University Press
- 2004 Messages, Signs, and Meanings: A Basic Textbook in Semiotics and Communication, 3rd ed. Toronto: Canadian Scholars Press
- 2007 The Quest for Meaning: A Guide to Semiotic Theory and Practice, Toronto: University of Toronto Press
- 2008 Why It Sells: Decoding the Meanings of Brand Names, Logos, Ads, and Other Marketing and Advertising Ploys, Lanham: Rowman & Littlefield
- 2013 Signs of Crime: Introduction to Forensic Semiotics, Berlin: Mouton de Gruyter
- 2013 The History of the Kiss: The Birth of Popular Culture, New York: Palgrave-Macmillan
- 2013 Discovery in Mathematics: An Interdisciplinary Approach, Munich: Lincom Europa
- 2013 (with Antonio Nicaso) Made Men: Mafia Culture and the Power of Symbols and Ritual, Rowman & Littlefield
- 2013 Encyclopedia of Media and Communication, University of Toronto Press
- 2015 Popular Culture: Introductory Perspectives, 3rd ed. Lanham: Rowman & Littlefield. Pp. xi, 330
- 2016 The Semiotics of Emoji: The Rise of Visual Language in the Age of the Internet, Bloomsbury Academic
- 2020 "Pi (π)" in Nature, Art, and Culture, Brill
