= Paul Cobley =

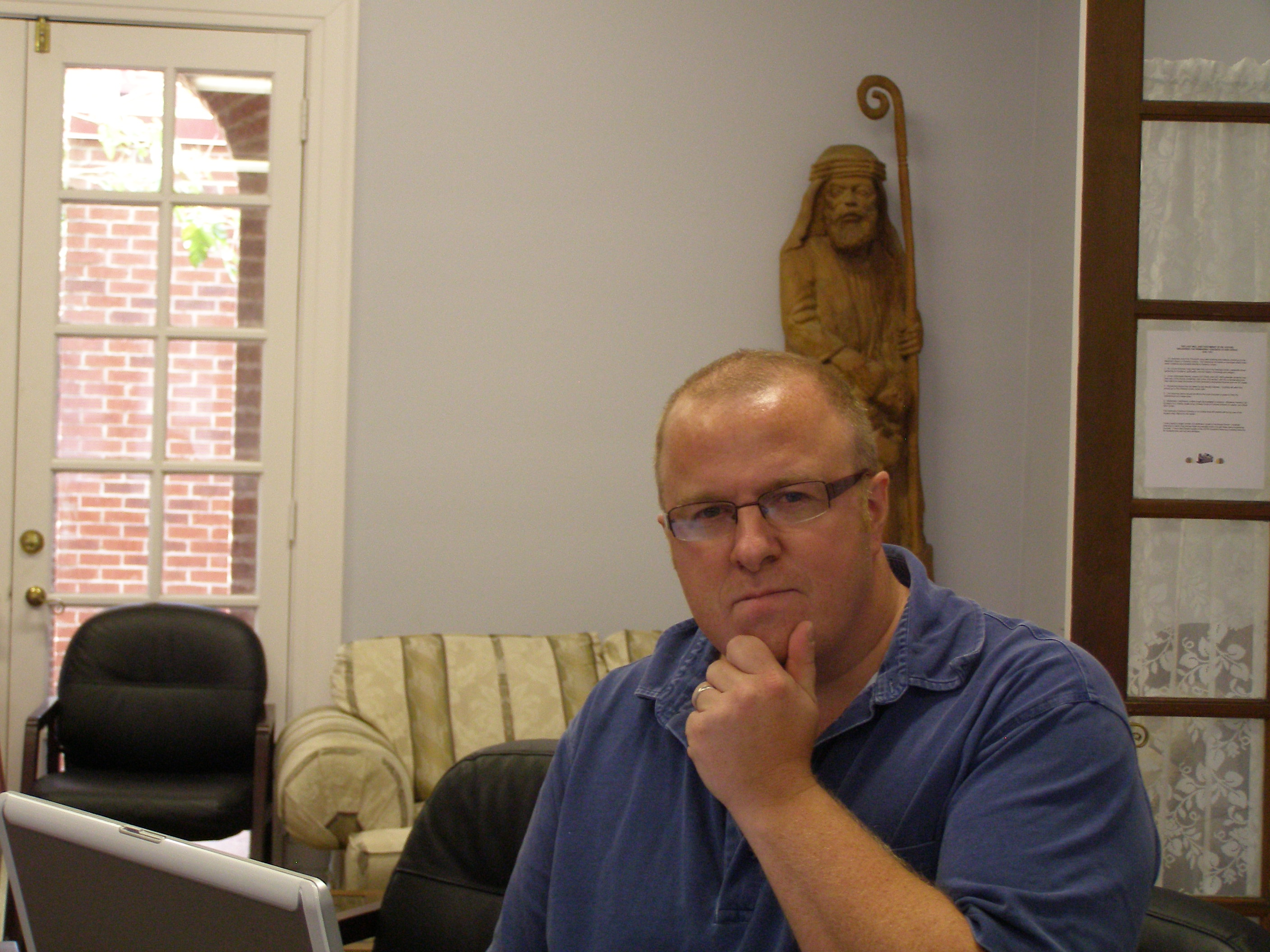
Paul Cobley

Paul Cobley (born on 24 April 1963) is an eminent British semiotician and narratologist.

He has served as Professor of Semiotics and Communications at London Metropolitan University. Since 2013, he is Professor in Language and Media at Middlesex University, London.

He is the President of the International Association for Semiotic Studies since 2014.

He did pioneering work in applying Peircean approaches to narratology. His important work involves the integration of different approaches and schools of semiotics. He authored the most widely translated semiotics introductory book.

He is a co-editor (together with Kalevi Kull) of the leading book series of semiotics "Semiotics, Communication and Cognition" (published by De Gruyter Mouton).

== Books ==
- Cobley, Paul (ed.) 1996. The Communication Theory Reader. London: Routledge.
- Cobley, Paul; Jansz, Litza 1997. Semiotics for Beginners. Cambridge: Icon Books.
- Briggs, Adam; Cobley, Paul (eds.) 1998. The Media: An Introduction. Harlow: Pearson Education. [Other editions: – Briggs, Adam; Cobley, Paul (eds.) 2002. The Media: An Introduction. 2nd edn. Harlow: Pearson Education. – Albertazzi, Daniele; Cobley, Paul (eds.) 2010. The Media: An Introduction. 3rd edn. Harlow: Pearson Education.
- Cobley, Paul 2000. The American Thriller: Generic Innovation and Social Change in the 1970s. London: Palgrave.
- Cobley, Paul 2001. Narrative. (New Critical Idiom series.) Routledge. 267 pp. (ISBN 0415212634)
- Cobley, Paul (ed.) 2001. The Routledge Companion to Semiotics and Linguistics. London: Routledge. (ISBN 0415243149)
- Cobley, Paul (ed.) 2006. Communication Theories: Critical Concepts in Media and Cultural Studies. 4 vols. London: Routledge.
- Cobley, Paul (ed.) 2009. Realism for the 21st Century: A John Deely Reader. Scranton: Scranton University Press.
- Cobley, Paul (ed.) 2010. The Routledge Companion to Semiotics. London: Routledge.
- Cobley, Paul; Deely, John; Kull, Kalevi; Petrilli, Susan (eds.) 2011. Semiotics Continues to Astonish: Thomas A. Sebeok and the Doctrine of Signs. (Semiotics, Communication and Cognition 7.) Berlin: De Gruyter Mouton.
- Thellefsen, Torkild; Sørensen, Bent; Cobley, Paul (eds.) 2011. From First to Third via Cybersemiotics: A Festschrift Honouring Professor Søren Brier on the occasion of his 60th Birthday. Frederiksberg: Scandinavian Book.
- Cobley, Paul; Schulz, Peter J. (eds.) 2013. Theories and Models of Communication. (Handbooks in Communication Science 1.) Berlin: De Gruyter Mouton.
- Favareau, Donald; Cobley, Paul; Kull, Kalevi (eds.) 2012. A More Developed Sign: Interpreting the Work of Jesper Hoffmeyer. (Tartu Semiotics Library 10.) Tartu: Tartu University Press.
- Cobley, Paul 2016. Cultural Implications of Biosemiotics. (Biosemiotics 15.) Berlin: Springer.
- Kull, Kalevi; Cobley, Paul (eds.) 2017. Biosemiotics in the community: Essays in honour of Donald Favareau. Tartu: University of Tartu Press.

== Honors ==
- In 2014, he received the highest honour in semiotics – Thomas A. Sebeok award.
- Festschrift for Paul Cobley's 60th birthday: special issue of Chinese Semiotic Studies 19(1), 2023.
- 2025 – Honorary Doctor of the University of Tartu
