= Herbert Koziol =

Professor of English historical linguistics

Herbert Koziol (5 October, 1903–31 December, 1986) was a professor of English historical linguistics at the University of Vienna's Department of English from 1961. Koziol was Karl Luick's successor from 1961. Koziol belonged to one of several generations of German-speaking English linguists who published cutting-edge research on English in the German language (see Select Publications).

Herbert Koziol was born and raised in Vienna, Austria.

== Education ==
Koziol received his doctorate, Dr. phil. in 1926 for the University of Vienna in Germanistik and Anglistik. He subsequently worked as a Gymnasium teacher from 1927 to 1932, when he published his "Habilitation" (second book) in English Historical Linguistics (University of Vienna); he is thus an immediate successor of Karl Luick (deceased in 1935). In 1932 Koziol joined the National Socialist Teacher's Federation (NSLB) and after Anschluss became an NSDAP member (member number 6,133,201) with his application from 22 June 1938. After the war, Koziol was considered as a minor collaborator and was allowed to continue with his profession.

From 1945 to 1961, Koziol was Full Professor of English Historical Linguistics at the University of Graz before, in 1961, he took a call to Vienna to hold the "Luick" Chair in English Historical Linguistics (succeeded by Gero Bauer, Herbert Schendl and, currently, Nikolaus Ritt). Koziol is primarily known for his revision of Luick's standard work in English historical grammar (1935–40) and in English word formation (1937, 1972).

== Select publications ==
Editor and author of the revised version of Karl Luick's Historische Grammatik der englischen Sprache (1935-1940)

Grammatik der englischen Sprache (1968)

Englische Wortbildungslehre, 2nd ed. (1972)

== Honours ==
Member of the Austrian Academy of Sciences (1961)

Festschrift Prof. Dr. Herbert Koziol zum siebzigsten Geburtstag, ed. by Gero Bauer, Franz K Stanzel and Franz Zaic. New Academic Press (1973).

Wilhelm Hartel Prize (1973)

== Notable students ==
- Herbert Schendl
