= John Deely =

American philosopher (1942–2017)

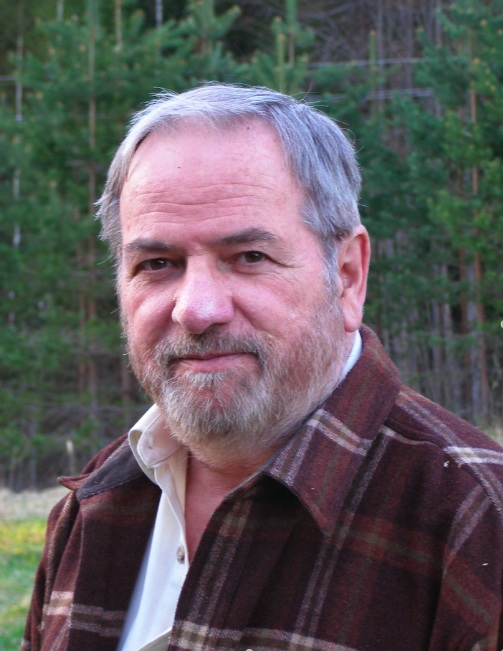
- John Deely (2009)
- Born: John Nathaniel Deely; 26 April 1942; Chicago, Illinois
- Died: 7 January 2017 (aged 74); Greensburg, Pennsylvania
- Spouse: Brooke Williams Smith

Education
- Education: Saint Vincent College

Philosophical work
- Era: 20th-/21st-century philosophy
- Region: Western philosophy
- School: Continental philosophy
- Main interests: Semiotics

John Deely (April 26, 1942 – January 7, 2017) was an American philosopher and semiotician. He was a professor of philosophy at Saint Vincent College and Seminary in Latrobe, Pennsylvania. Prior to this, he held the Rudman Chair of Graduate Philosophy at the Center for Thomistic Studies, located at the University of St. Thomas (Houston).

His main research concerned the role of semiosis (the action of signs) in mediating objects and things. He specifically investigated the manner in which experience itself is a dynamic structure (or web) woven of triadic relations (signs in the strict sense) whose elements or terms (representamens, significates and interpretants) interchange positions and roles over time in the spiral of semiosis. He was 2006–2007 Executive Director of the Semiotic Society of America.

A number of his works have been published in the journal Advances in Semiotics, including one of his most popular publications, Introducing Semiotics: Its History and Doctrine (1982), as well as Frontiers in Semiotics (1986), edited by Brooke Williams and Felicia Kruse.

== Biography ==
=== Education ===
Deely was educated at the Pontifical Faculty of Philosophy of the Aquinas Institute of Theology in River Forest, Illinois, where he received a Ph.D. in 1967.

=== Contributions to semiotics ===
John Deely first became aware of semiotics as a distinct subject matter during the course of his work on language at the Institute for Philosophical Research in Chicago as a senior research fellow under the direction of Mortimer J. Adler, through reading Jacques Maritain and John Poinsot, which led to his original contact with Thomas Sebeok in 1968 with a proposal to prepare a critical edition of Poinsot's Tractatus de Signis (1632) as the earliest full systematization of an inquiry into the being proper to signs. This proposal turned out to require 15 years to complete. Deely and Sebeok became close associates, notably in the 1975 founding of the Semiotic Society of America, in which project Sebeok had Deely function as secretary of the committee drafting the constitution.

In 1980, Sebeok asked Deely to take charge of the development of the SSA annual proceedings volumes, to which end Deely developed the distinctive SSA Style Sheet, which takes as its principle foundation the fact that no one writes after he dies, as a consequence of which primary source dates should always come from the lifetime of the cited source—the principle of historical layering—because it reveals the layers of discourse just as the layers of rocks reveal the history of the Earth to a trained geologist.

Sebeok in his foreword to Deely's 1982 Introducing Semiotics (p. x), identified Deely's work on Poinsot's Tractatus de Signis as

the 'missing link' between the ancients and the moderns in the history of semiotic, a pivot as well as a divide between two huge intellective landscapes the ecology of neither of which could be fully appreciated prior to this major publishing event.

This 1982 work of Deely's was based upon his 1981 essay, "The relation of logic to semiotics," which won the first Mouton D'or Award for Best Essay in the Field in the Calendar Year (Semiotica 35.3/4, 193–265).

In 1990, Deely published a work titled Basics of Semiotics, which Sebeok called "the only successful modern English introduction to semiotics." Sebeok himself, beginning in 1963, had effectively argued that the then prevailing name for the study of signs—semiology—in fact concealed a fallacy of mistaking a part for a larger whole (the "pars pro toto" fallacy). Like Locke, Peirce, and Jakobson, Sebeok considered that 'semiotics' was the proper name for a whole in which 'semiology' focuses only on the anthropocentric part, and that the action of signs extends well beyond the realm of culture to include the whole realm of living things, a view summarized today in the term biosemiotics.

Deely, however, notably in Basics of Semiotics, laid down the argument that the action of signs extends even further than life, and that semiosis as an influence of the future played a role in the shaping of the physical universe prior to the advent of life, a role for which Deely coined the term physiosemiosis. Thus the argument whether the manner in which the action of signs permeates the universe includes the nonliving as well as the living stands, as it were, as determining the "final frontier" of semiotics. Deely's argument, which he first expressed at the 1989 Charles Sanders Peirce Sesquicentennial International Congress at Harvard University, if successful, would render nugatory Peirce's "sop to Cerberus." Deely's Basics of Semiotics, of which six expanded editions have been published across nine languages, deals with semiotics in this expansive sense.

In Medieval Philosophy Redefined (2010), Deely employed Peirce's notion of semiotics as a cenoscopic science to show how the Latin Age, from St. Augustine to John Poinsot, marked the first florescence of semiotic consciousness—only to be eclipsed in philosophy by the modern "subjective turn" to 'epistemology' (and later the "linguistic turn" to 'analytic philosophy'), which Sebeok called the "cryptosemiotic" period. The full return to semiotic consciousness, Deely argued, was launched by the work of Charles S. Peirce, beginning most notably with his New List of Categories.

In his other work of 2010, Semiotics Seen Synchronically, Deely described semiotics (in contrast with semiology) as a contemporary phenomenon of intellectual culture consolidated largely through the organizational, editorial, and literary work of Thomas Sebeok himself.

=== Personal life ===
Deely was married to the Maritain scholar Brooke Williams Deely (née Smith).

== Publications ==
- Introducing Semiotic: Its History and Doctrine (Indiana Univ., 1982).
- Basics of Semiotics:
  - 1st ed., originally published simultaneously in English (Bloomington, IN: Indiana University Press, 1990) and Portuguese (as Semiótica Basica, trans. Julio Pinto and Julio Jeha [São Paulo, Brazil: Atica Editora]). Bazele Semioticii, trans. Mariana Neţ (Bucarest: ALL s.r.l, 1993). Basics of Semiotics, Japanese edition (Hosei University Press, 1994). Subsequent expanded editions listed in following entries.
  - 2nd ed., Los Fundamentos de la Semiotica, trans. José Luis Caivano and Mauricio Beuchot (Expanded 2nd ed.; Mexico City: Universidad Iberoamericana, 1996). Ukrainian edition, trans. Anatolij Karas (Lviv University, 2000).
  - 3rd ed., further expanded, Basi della semiotica, trans. Massimo Leone, with and Introduction by Susan Petrilli and Augusto Ponzio (Bari, Italy: Laterza, 2004).
  - 4th ed., expanded again, bilingual Estonian and English, trans. Kati Lindström (Tartu Semiotics Library 4; Tartu, Estonia: Tartu University Press, 2005).
  - 5th ed., again expanded, English only (Tartu Semiotics Library 4.2; Tartu, Estonia: Tartu University Press, 2009).
  - 6th ed., yet again expanded, Chinese only, trans. Zujian Zhang (Beijing: Renmin University Press, 2011.
- Four Ages of Understanding (Univ Toronto: 2001).
- What Distinguishes Human Understanding (St. Augustine's: 2002).
- The Impact on Philosophy of Semiotics (St. Augustine's: 2003).
- Intentionality and Semiotics (Scranton: 2007).
- Descartes & Poinsot: The Crossroads of Signs and Ideas (Scranton: 2008).
- Augustine & Poinsot: The Semiotic Development (Scranton: 2009).
- Semiotic Animal (St. Augustine's: 2010).
- Semiotics Seen Synchronically: The View from 2010 (LEGAS: 2010).
- Medieval Philosophy Redefined: The Development of Cenoscopic Science, AD354 to 1644 (From the Birth of Augustine to the Death of Poinsot) (University of Scranton: 2010).
- "Theses on Semiology and Semiotics", The American Journal of Semiotics 26.1–4 (2010), 17–25.
- Purely Objective Reality (De Gruyter Mouton: 2011).
- Semiotics Continues to Astonish (De Gruyter Mouton: 2011) (With Paul Cobley, Kalevi Kull, and Susan Petrilli).

See also pp. 391–422 of Realism for the 21st Century: A John Deely Reader, ed. Paul Cobley (Scranton Univ.: 2009) for a 285-item bibliography. See under "External links" for online works and bibliographies.

== Ideas ==
=== Cenoscopy and Ideoscopy ===
In his work on René Descartes and Poinsot, Deely highlights how Charles Sanders Peirce drew on Jeremy Bentham who proposed understanding on the basis common to all as cenoscopy and science which wishes to discover new phenomenon as ideoscopy. John Deely writes:

Indeed, one way of understanding that historical period or epoch in European history called "the Enlightenment" is precisely as that period when ideoscopy began to take hold and demand institutionalization within the framework of the developing "communities of inquirers" inspired by the idea of the university, even though that idea as so-far-institutionalized fell short of the needs for adequately and appropriately supporting the emergent growth of ideoscopy. The exuberance of the early generations of inquirers who turned to ideoscopy, especially in the mathematization of the results of experimentation and observation acquired by the systematic use of instruments which extended the unaided powers of the body, led to a naive but general expectation that ideoscopy, the development of science in the definitively modern sense, would "slow by slow" supplant cenoscopy entirely.

== See also ==
- Charles Sanders Peirce
- John Poinsot
- Postmodern philosophy § Definitional issues
- Semiotic Society of America
- Thomas Sebeok § Sebeok Fellow Award
