= The American Journal of Semiotics =

Academic journal on semiotics

- Discipline: Semiotics
- Language: English
- Edited by: André De Tienne

Publication details
- History: 1981–present
- Publisher: Philosophy Documentation Center on behalf of the Semiotic Society of America (United States)
- Frequency: quarterly

Standard abbreviations
- ISO 4: Am. J. Semiot.

Indexing
- ISSN: 0277-7126 (print); 2153-2990 (web)
- LCCN: 82-642788
- OCLC no.: 7632823

Links
- Journal homepage; Online access; Special issues

The American Journal of Semiotics is a peer-reviewed academic journal covering semiotics. It was established in 1981 and is the official journal of the Semiotic Society of America. The journal publishes articles, responses or comments, and critical reviews. All volumes are available online from the Philosophy Documentation Center.

== Abstracting and indexing ==
The American Journal of Semiotics is abstracted and indexed in International Bibliography of Book Reviews of Scholarly Literature, International Bibliography of Periodical Literature, Linguistics and Language Behavior Abstracts, MLA International Bibliography, PhilPapers, and ProQuest databases.

== See also ==
- List of philosophy journals
- List of social science journals
- Semiotica
- Sign Systems Studies
