= Karl Luick =

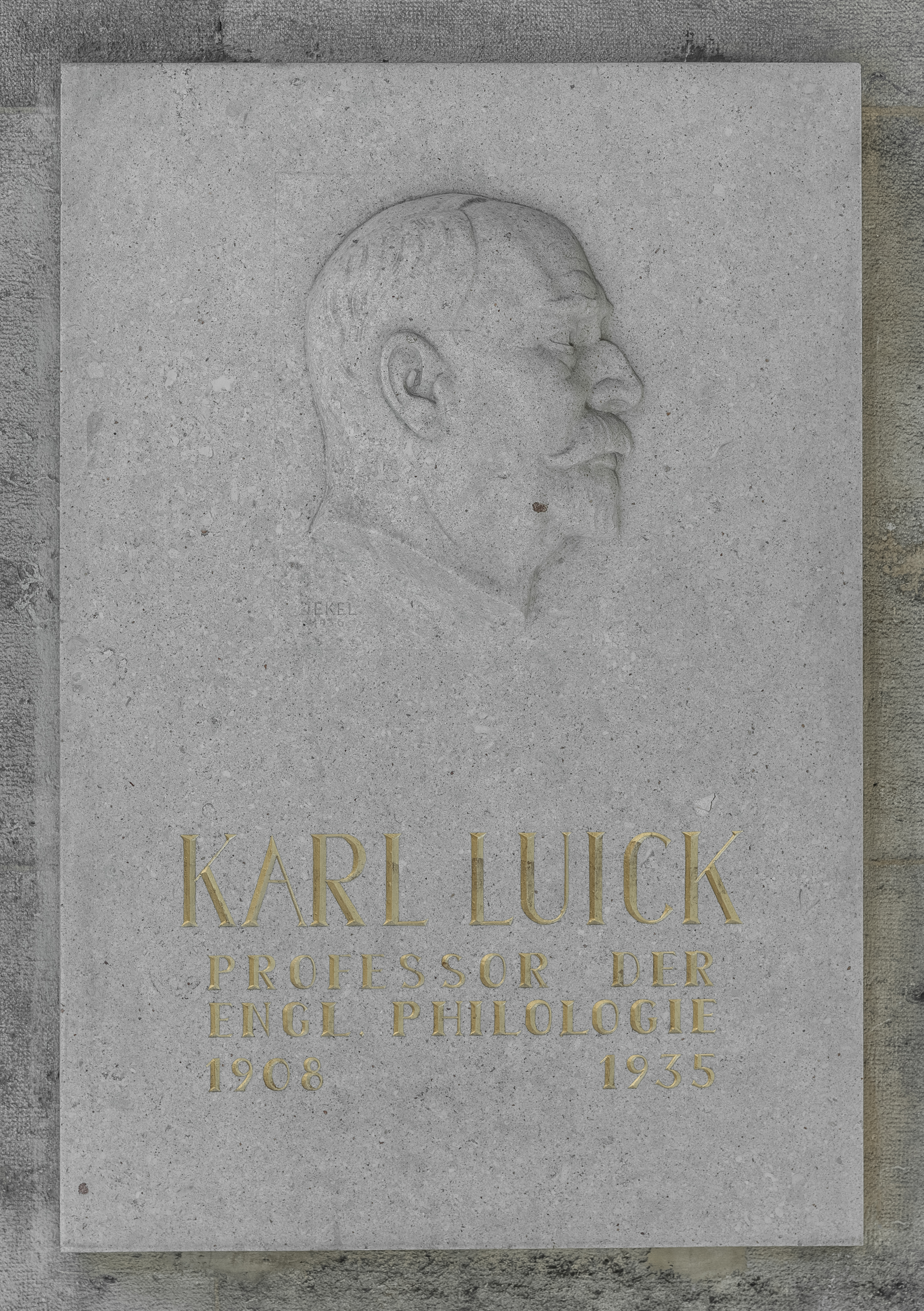
Relief of Karl Luick at the University of Vienna

Karl Luick (1865–1935) was the de facto founder of the Vienna School of English historical linguistics, which was continued by Herbert Koziol and has been expanded, most notably and most recently, by Herbert Schendl and Nikolaus Ritt as the most recent holders of the "Luick Chair" in English historical linguistics.

== Biography ==
Luick was born on 27 January 1865 in Floridsdorf, which is now part of Vienna. He died on 20 September 1935 in Vienna. Luick studied English and other languages at the University of Vienna, where he passed the examinations to be a high school teacher in 1888, received his doctorate in 1889 and his habilitation ("second book") in 1890, all from the University of Vienna. Before completing his doctorate, he spent some time in England and France, then became a privatdocent at the University of Vienna. In 1891, Luick had his habilitation transferred to the University of Graz, where he founded the Department of English, in 1893 a.o. Professor in Graz, the year he turned down a call to the University of Heidelberg. In 1898 he became Full Professor at the University of Graz, in 1900/01 Dean at that university. In 1908, he responded to a call from the University of Vienna as Full Professor. In 1915, he became a full member of the Austrian Academy of Sciences and on 3 July 1925, he received a call to a newly created second chair of English Philology at the Berlin Friedrich-Wilhelms University, which he turned down. In 1926, he became rector of the University of Vienna. Luick was also a member of the Berlin Academy of Sciences.

== Academic work ==
His most important publication is his Historische Grammatik der englischen Sprache in two volumes originally published in 1914 and 1921. In its 1964 edition by Blackwell Publishers, the work is still a key text in the field of historical phonology. Luick also published on English literate and German dialectology, above all the Austrian German dialects and the emerging Austrian standard variety of German.
