= Social class =

Hierarchical stratification of societies

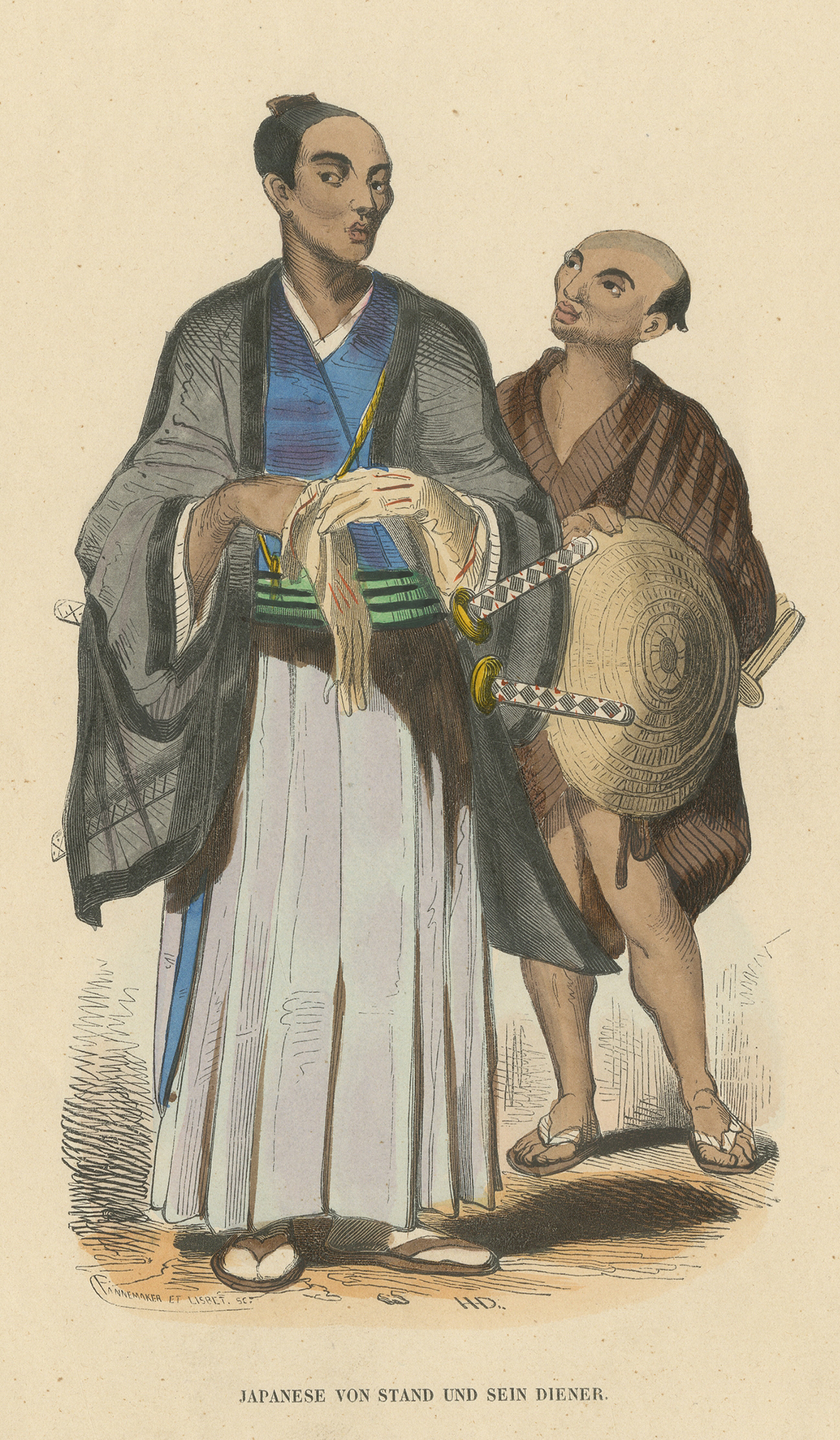
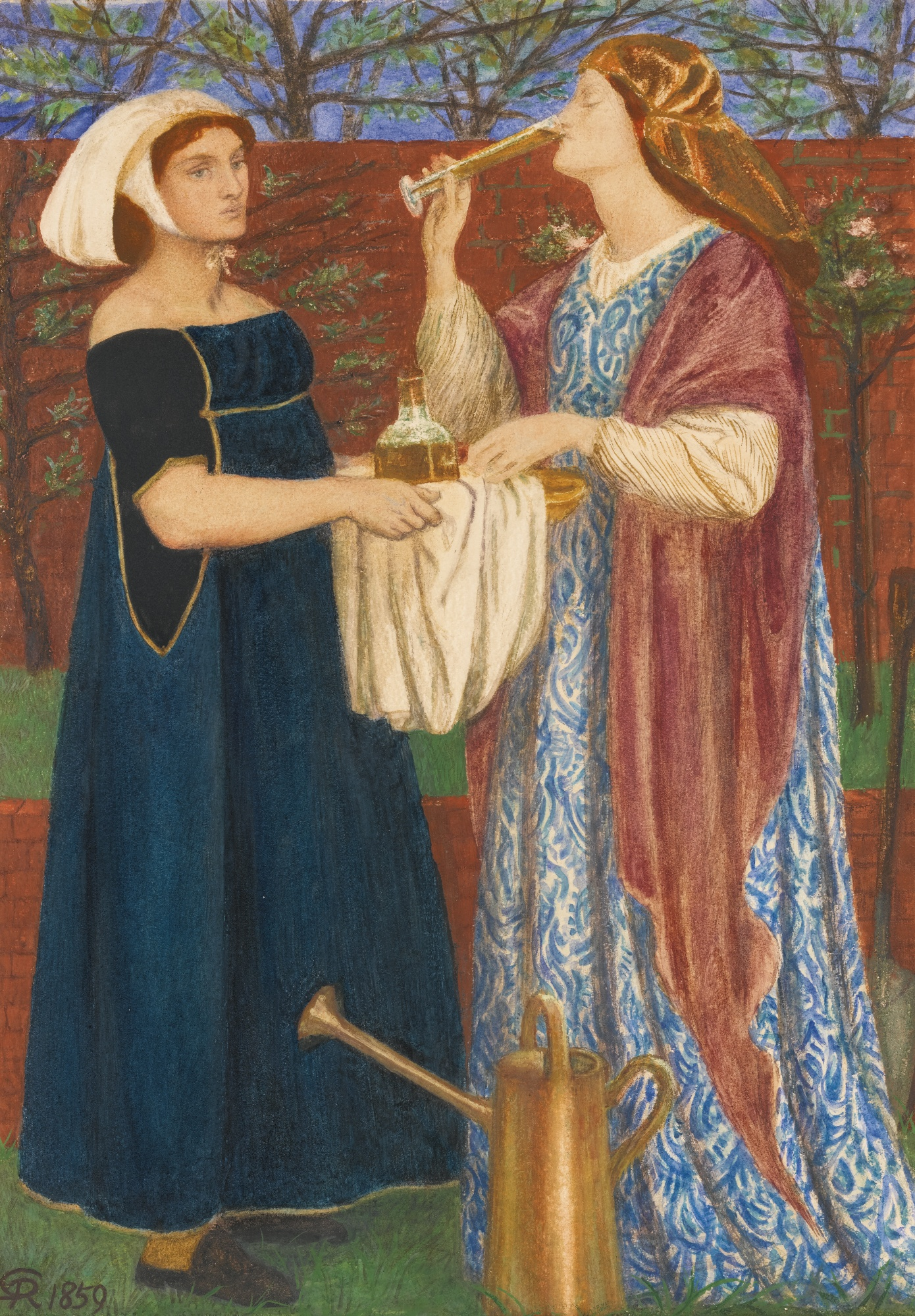
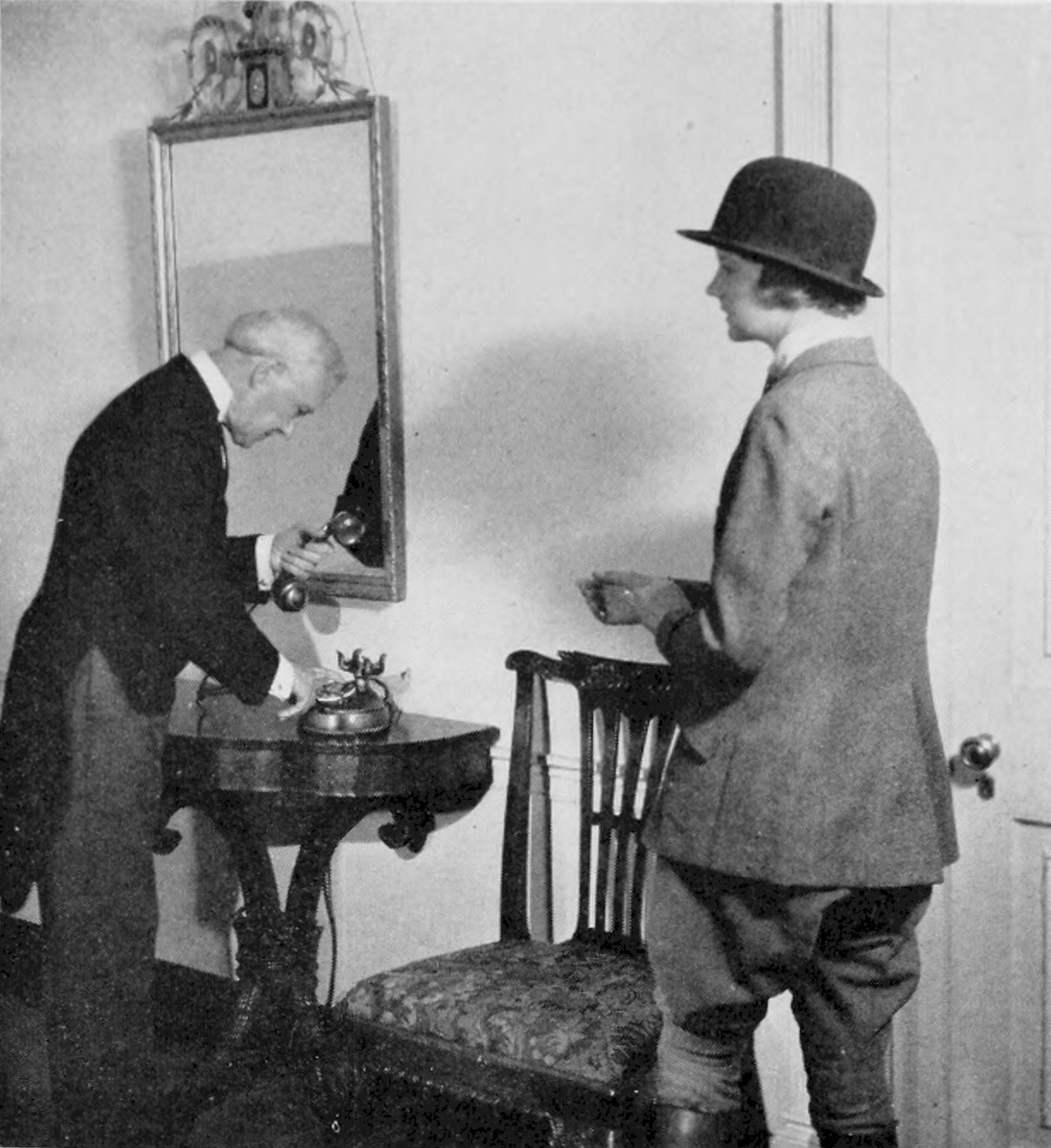
From top-left to bottom-right or from top to bottom (mobile): a samurai and his servant, c. 1846; The Bower Garden, painting by Dante Gabriel Rossetti, 1859; a butler places a telephone call, 1922

A social class or social stratum is a grouping of people into a set of hierarchical social categories, the most common ones being: the working class, the middle class and the upper class.

Class is a subject of analysis for sociologists, political scientists, anthropologists and social historians. The term has a wide range of sometimes conflicting meanings, and there is no broad consensus on a definition of class. Some people argue that due to social mobility, class boundaries do not exist. In common parlance, the term social class is usually synonymous with socioeconomic class, defined as "people having the same social, economic, cultural, political or educational status", such as the working class, or "an emerging professional class". However, academics distinguish social class from socioeconomic status, using the former to refer to one's relatively stable cultural background and the latter to refer to one's current social and economic situation, which is consequently more changeable over time.

The precise measurements of what determines social class in society have varied over time. Karl Marx defined class by one's relationship to the means of production (their relations of production). His understanding of classes in modern capitalist society is that the proletariat work but do not own the means of production, and the bourgeoisie, those who invest and live off the surplus generated by the proletariat's operation of the means of production, do not work at all. This contrasts with the view of the sociologist Max Weber, who contrasted class as determined by economic position, with social status (Stand) which is determined by social prestige rather than just relations of production. The term class is etymologically derived from the Latin classis, which was used by census takers to categorize citizens by wealth in order to determine military service obligations.

In the late 18th century, the term class began to replace classifications such as estates, rank and orders as the primary means of organizing society into hierarchical divisions. This corresponded to a general decrease in significance ascribed to hereditary characteristics and an increase in the significance of wealth and income as indicators of position in the social hierarchy.

== History ==
=== Ancient Egypt ===
The existence of a class system dates back to times of Ancient Egypt, where the position of elite was also characterized by literacy. The wealthier people were at the top in the social order and common people and slaves being at the bottom. However, the class was not rigid; a man of humble origins could ascend to a high post.

The ancient Egyptians viewed men and women, including people from all social classes, as essentially equal under the law, and even the lowliest peasant was entitled to petition the vizier and his court for redress.

Farmers made up the bulk of the population, but agricultural produce was owned directly by the state, temple, or noble family that owned the land. Farmers were also subject to a labor tax and were required to work on irrigation or construction projects in a corvée system. Artists and craftsmen were of higher status than farmers, but they were also under state control, working in the shops attached to the temples and paid directly from the state treasury. Scribes and officials formed the upper class in ancient Egypt, known as the "white kilt class" in reference to the bleached linen garments that served as a mark of their rank. The upper class prominently displayed their social status in art and literature. Below the nobility were the priests, physicians, and engineers with specialized training in their field. It is unclear whether slavery as understood today existed in ancient Egypt; there is difference of opinions among authors.

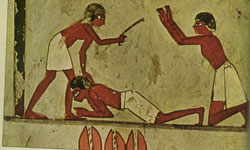
Slave beating in ancient Egypt

Not a single Egyptian was, in our sense of the word, free. No individual could call in question a hierarchy of authority which culminated in a living god.

— Emile Durkheim

Although slaves were mostly used as indentured servants, they were able to buy and sell their servitude, work their way to freedom or nobility, and were usually treated by doctors in the workplace.

=== Elsewhere ===
In Ancient Greece, when the clan system (Note: based on blood relations) was declining, the classes (Note: based on occupation) replaced the clan society when it became too small to sustain the needs of increasing population. The division of labor is also essential for the growth of classes.

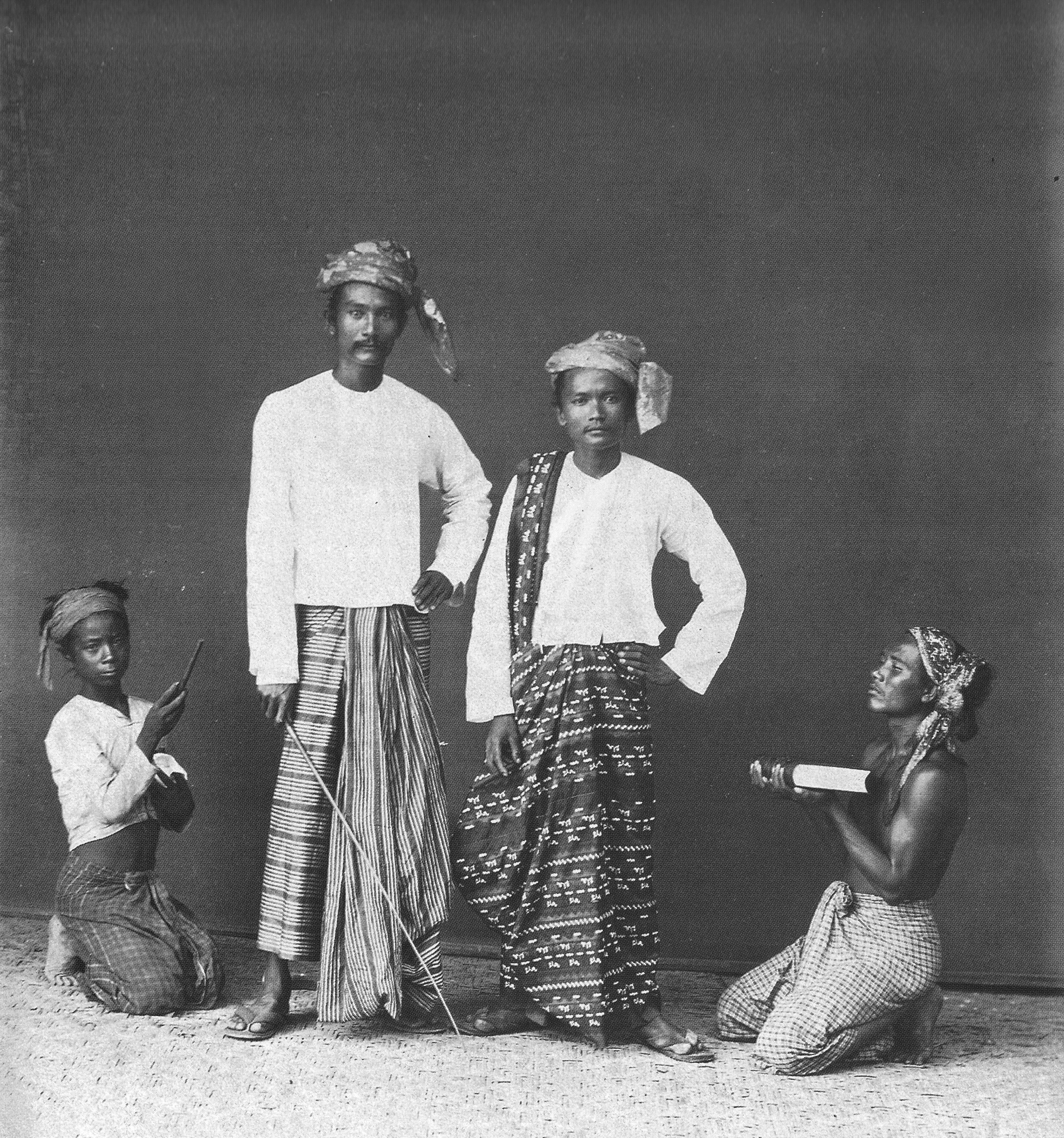
Burmese nobles and servants

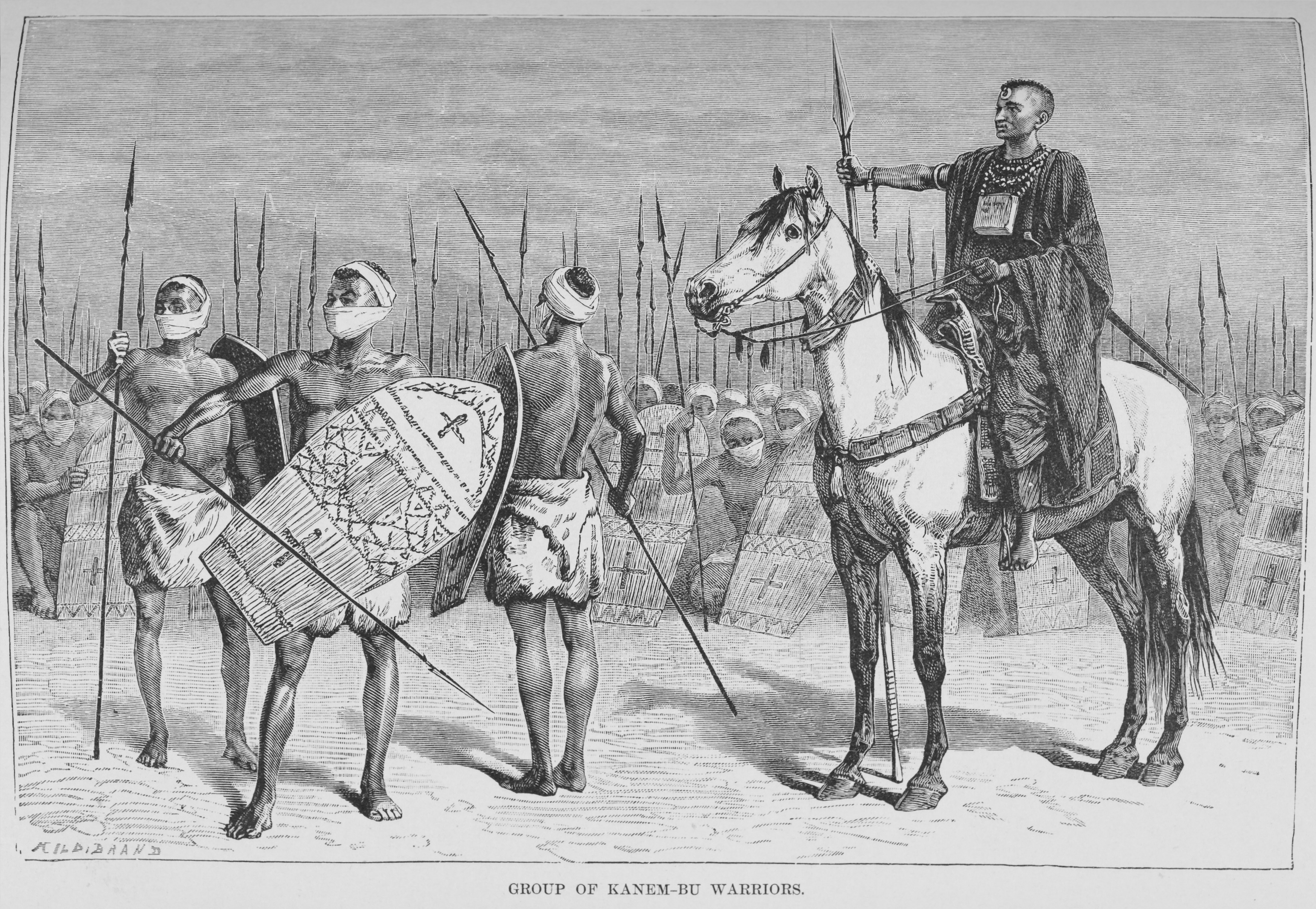
Nigerian warriors armed with spears in the retinue of a mounted war chief. The Earth and Its Inhabitants, 1892

Historically, social class and behavior were laid down in law. For example, permitted mode of dress in some times and places was strictly regulated, with sumptuous dressing only for the high ranks of society and aristocracy, whereas sumptuary laws stipulated the dress and jewelry appropriate for a person's social rank and station. In Europe, these laws became increasingly commonplace during the Middle Ages. However, these laws were prone to change due to societal changes, and in many cases, these distinctions may either almost disappear, such as the distinction between a patrician and a plebeian being almost erased during the late Roman Republic.

Jean-Jacques Rousseau had a large influence over political ideals of the French Revolution because of his views of inequality and classes. Rousseau saw humans as "naturally pure and good," meaning that humans from birth were seen as innocent and any evilness was learned. He believed that social problems arise through the development of society and suppress the innate pureness of humankind. He also believed that private property is the main reason for social issues in society because private property creates inequality through the property's value. Even though his theory predicted if there were no private property then there would be wide spread equality, Rousseau accepted that there will always be social inequality because of how society is viewed and run.

Later Enlightenment thinkers viewed inequality as valuable and crucial to society's development and prosperity. They also acknowledged that private property will ultimately cause inequality because specific resources that are privately owned can be stored and the owners profit off of the deficit of the resource. This can create competition between the classes that was seen as necessary by these thinkers. This also creates stratification between the classes keeping a distinct difference between lower, poorer classes and the higher, wealthier classes.

India (↑), Nepal, North Korea (↑), Sri Lanka (↑) and some Indigenous peoples maintain social classes today.

In class societies, class conflict has tended to recur or is ongoing, depending on the sociological and anthropolitical perspective. Class societies have not always existed; there have been widely different types of class communities. For example, societies based on age rather than capital. During colonialism, social relations were dismantled by force, which gave rise to societies based on the social categories of waged labor, private property, and capital.

== Class society ==
Class society or class-based society is an organizing principle society in which ownership of property, means of production, and wealth is the determining factor of the distribution of power, in which those with more property and wealth are stratified higher in the society and those without access to the means of production and without wealth are stratified lower in the society. In a class society, at least implicitly, people are divided into distinct social strata, commonly referred to as social classes or castes. The nature of class society is a matter of sociological research. Class societies exist all over the globe in both industrialized and developing nations. In terms of public opinion, nine out of ten people in a Swedish survey considered it correct that they are living in a class society.

=== Comparative sociological research ===
One may use comparative methods to study class societies, using, for example, comparison of Gini coefficients, de facto educational opportunities, unemployment, and culture.

=== Effect on the population ===
Societies with large class differences have a greater proportion of people who suffer from mental health issues such as anxiety and depression symptoms. A series of scientific studies have demonstrated this relationship. Statistics support this assertion and results are found in life expectancy and overall health; for example, in the case of high differences in life expectancy between two Stockholm suburbs. The differences between life expectancy of the poor and less-well-educated inhabitants who live in proximity to the station Vårby gård, and the highly educated and more affluent inhabitants living near Danderyd differ by 18 years.

Similar data about New York is also available for life expectancy, average income per capita, income distribution, median income mobility for people who grew up poor, share with a bachelor's degree or higher.

In class societies, the lower classes systematically receive lower-quality education and care. There are more explicit effects where those within the higher class actively demonize parts of the lower-class population.

== Theoretical models ==
Definitions of social classes reflect a number of sociological perspectives, informed by anthropology, economics, psychology and sociology. The major perspectives historically have been Marxism and structural functionalism. The common stratum model of class divides society into a simple hierarchy of working class, middle class and upper class. Within academia, two broad schools of definitions emerge: those aligned with 20th-century sociological stratum models of class society and those aligned with the 19th-century historical materialist economic models of the Marxists and anarchists.

Another distinction can be drawn between analytical concepts of social class, such as the Marxist and Weberian traditions, as well as the more empirical traditions such as socioeconomic status approach, which notes the correlation of income, education and wealth with social outcomes without necessarily implying a particular theory of social structure. Some interpretations of class have been criticized as essentialist.

=== Marxist ===
"[Classes are] large groups of people differing from each other by the place they occupy in a historically determined system of social production, by their relation (in most cases fixed and formulated in law) to the means of production, by their role in the social organization of labor, and, consequently, by the dimensions of the share of social wealth of which they dispose and the mode of acquiring it."

— Vladimir Lenin, A Great Beginning in June 1919

For Marx, class is a combination of objective and subjective factors. Objectively, a class shares a common relationship to the means of production. The class society itself is understood as the aggregated phenomenon to the "interlinked movement", which generates the quasi-objective concept of capital. Subjectively, the members will necessarily have some perception ("class consciousness") of their similarity and common interest. Class consciousness is not simply an awareness of one's own class interest but is also a set of shared views regarding how society should be organized legally, culturally, socially and politically. These class relations are reproduced through time.

In Marxist theory, the class structure of the capitalist mode of production is characterized by the conflict between two main classes: the bourgeoisie, the capitalists who own the means of production and the much larger proletariat (or "working class") who must sell their own labour power (wage labour). This is the fundamental economic structure of work and property, a state of inequality that is normalized and reproduced through cultural ideology.

For Marxists, every person in the process of production has separate social relationships and issues. Along with this, every person is placed into different groups that have similar interests and values that can differ drastically from group to group. Class is special in that does not relate to specifically to a singular person, but to a specific role.

Marxists explain the history of "civilized" societies in terms of a war of classes between those who control production and those who produce the goods or services in society. In the Marxist view of capitalism, this is a conflict between capitalists (bourgeoisie) and wage-workers (the proletariat). For Marxists, class antagonism is rooted in the situation that control over social production necessarily entails control over the class which produces goods—in capitalism this is the exploitation of workers by the bourgeoisie.

Furthermore, "in countries where modern civilisation has become fully developed, a new class of petty bourgeois has been formed". "An industrial army of workmen, under the command of a capitalist, requires, like a real army, officers (managers) and sergeants (foremen, over-lookers) who, while the work is being done, command in the name of the capitalist".

Marx makes the argument that, as the bourgeoisie reach a point of wealth accumulation, they hold enough power as the dominant class to shape political institutions and society according to their own interests. Marx then goes on to claim that the non-elite class, owing to their large numbers, have the power to overthrow the elite and create an equal society.

In The Communist Manifesto, Marx himself argued that it was the goal of the proletariat itself to displace the capitalist system with socialism, changing the social relationships underpinning the class system and then developing into a future communist society in which: "the free development of each is the condition for the free development of all". This would mark the beginning of a classless society in which human needs rather than profit would be motive for production. In a society with democratic control and production for use, there would be no class, no state and no need for financial and banking institutions and money.

These theorists have taken this binary class system and expanded it to include contradictory class locations, the idea that a person can be employed in many different class locations that fall between the two classes of proletariat and bourgeoisie. Erik Olin Wright stated that class definitions are more diverse and elaborate through identifying with multiple classes, having familial ties with people in different a class, or having a temporary leadership role.

Class stratification is theorized to come directly from capitalism.

=== Weberian ===
Max Weber formulated a three-component theory of stratification that saw social class as emerging from an interplay between "class", "status" and "power". Weber believed that class position was determined by a person's relationship to the means of production, while status or "Stand" emerged from estimations of honor or prestige.

Weber views class as a group of people who have common goals and opportunities that are available to them. This means that what separates each class from each other is their value in the marketplace through their own goods and services. This creates a divide between the classes through the assets that they have such as property and expertise.

Weber developed many of his key concepts on social stratification by examining the social structures of various countries. He noted that, contrary to Marx's theories, stratification was based on more than just ownership of capital. Weber pointed out that some members of the aristocracy lacked economic wealth yet still possessed political power. Similarly, in Europe, many wealthy Jewish families lacked prestige and honor because they were considered part of a "pariah group".

- Class: A person's economic position in a society. Weber differs from Marx in that he does not see this as the supreme factor in stratification. Weber noted how managers of corporations or industries control firms they do not own.
- Status: A person's prestige, social honour or popularity in a society. Weber noted that political power was not rooted in capital value solely, but also in one's status. Poets and saints, for example, can possess immense influence on society with often little economic worth.
- Power: A person's ability to get their way despite the resistance of others. For example, individuals in state jobs, such as an employee of the Federal Bureau of Investigation, or a member of the United States Congress, may hold little property or status, but they still hold immense power.

=== Bourdieu ===
For Bourdieu, the place in the social strata for any person is vaguer than the equivalent in Weberian sociology. Bourdieu introduced an array of concepts of what he refers to as types of capital. These types were economic capital, in the form assets convertible to money and secured as private property. This type of capital is separated from the other types of culturally constituted types of capital, which Bourdieu introduces, which are: personal cultural capital (formal education, knowledge); objective cultural capital (books, art); and institutionalized cultural capital (honours and titles).

=== Great British Class Survey ===
On 2 April 2013, the results of a survey conducted by BBC Lab UK developed in collaboration with academic experts and slated to be published in the journal Sociology were published online. The results released were based on a survey of 160,000 residents of the United Kingdom most of whom lived in England and described themselves as "white". Class was defined and measured according to the amount and kind of economic, cultural and social resources reported. Economic capital was defined as income and assets; cultural capital as amount and type of cultural interests and activities; and social capital as the quantity and social status of their friends, family and personal and business contacts. This theoretical framework was developed by Pierre Bourdieu who first published his theory of social distinction in 1979.

=== Three-level economic class model ===
Today, concepts of social class often assume three general economic categories: a very wealthy and powerful upper class that owns and controls the means of production; a middle class of professional workers, small business owners and low-level managers; and a lower class, who rely on low-paying jobs for their livelihood and experience poverty.

==== Upper class ====
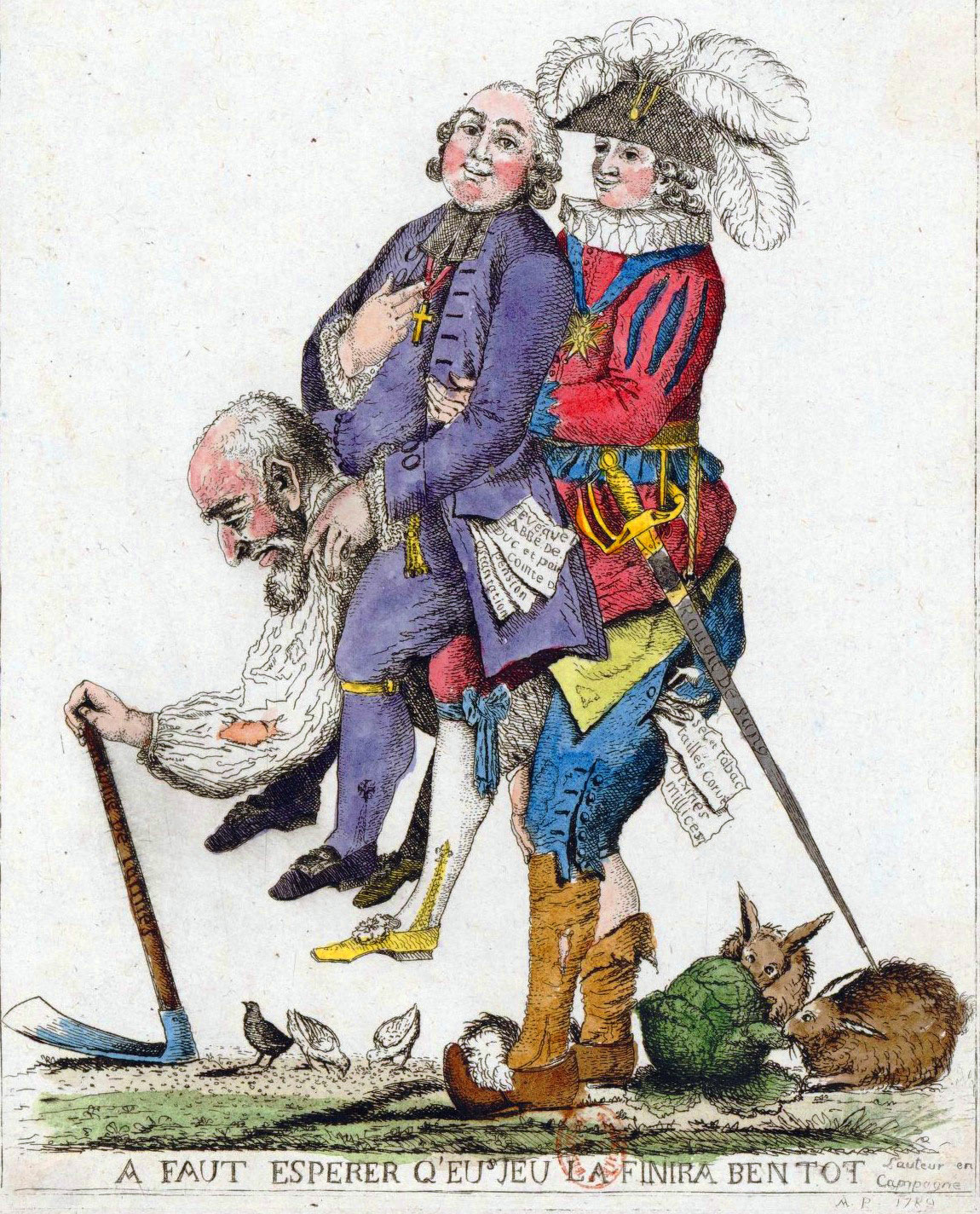
A symbolic image of three orders of feudal society in Europe prior to the French Revolution, which shows the rural third estate carrying the clergy and the nobility

The upper class is the social class composed of those who are rich, well-born, powerful, or a combination of those. They usually wield the greatest political power. In some countries, wealth alone is sufficient to allow entry into the upper class. In others, only people who are born or marry into certain aristocratic bloodlines are considered members of the upper class and those who gain great wealth through commercial activity are looked down upon by the aristocracy as nouveau riche.

In the United Kingdom, for example, the upper classes consist of the aristocracy and royalty, with wealth playing a less important role in class status. Many aristocratic peerages or titles come with seats attached to them, where the titleholder (e.g., Earl of Bristol) and their family act as custodians of the house but are not the owners. Maintaining these estates often requires significant expenditures, so wealth is typically necessary. Many aristocratic peerages and their homes are part of larger estates, owned and managed by the titleholder, with income generated from the land, rents, or other sources of wealth; however, in the United States where there is no aristocracy or royalty, the upper class status exclusive of Americans of ancestral wealth or patricians of European ancestry is referred to in the media as the extremely wealthy, the so-called "super-rich", though there is some tendency even in the United States for those with old family wealth to look down on those who have accrued their money through business, the struggle between new money and old money.

The upper class is generally contained within the richest one or two percent of the population. Members of the upper class are often born into it and are distinguished by immense wealth which is passed from generation to generation in the form of estates. Based on some new social and political theories, the upper class consists of the most wealthy decile group in society, holding nearly 87% of the whole society's wealth.

==== Middle class ====
See also: Middle-class squeeze

The middle class is the group of people with jobs that pay significantly more than the poverty line. Examples of these types of jobs are factory workers, salespeople, teachers, cooks and nurses. There is a new trend by some scholars which assumes that the size of the middle class in every society is the same. For example, in paradox of interest theory, the middle class are those who are in 6th–9th decile groups, holding nearly 12% of the whole society's wealth.

The middle class is the most contested of the three categories, the broad group of people in contemporary society who fall socio-economically between the lower and upper classes. One example of the contest of this term is that in the United States "middle class" is applied very broadly and includes people who would elsewhere be considered working class. Middle-class workers are sometimes called "white-collar workers".

Theorists such as Ralf Dahrendorf have noted the tendency toward an enlarged middle class in modern Western societies, particularly in relation to the necessity of an educated work force in technological economies. Perspectives concerning globalization and neocolonialism, such as dependency theory, suggest this is due to the shift of low-level labour to developing nations and the Third World.

==== Lower class ====
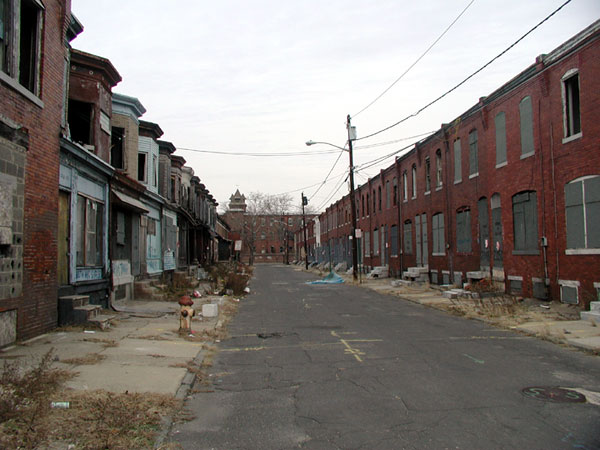
In many countries, the lowest stratum of the working class, the underclass, often lives in urban areas with low-quality civil services

The lower class (occasionally described as the working class) are those employed in low-paying wage jobs with very little economic security. The term "lower class" also refers to persons with low income.

The working class is sometimes separated into those who are employed but lacking financial security (the "working poor") and an underclass—those who are long-term unemployed and/or homeless, especially those receiving welfare from the state. The latter is today considered analogous to the Marxist term "lumpenproletariat". However, during the time of Marx's writing the lumpenproletariat referred to those in dire poverty; such as the homeless. Members of the working class are sometimes called blue-collar workers.

== Consequences of class position ==
A person's socioeconomic class has wide-ranging effects. It can determine the schools they are able to attend, their health, the jobs open to them, when they exit the labour market (retire), whom they may marry and their treatment by police and the courts.

Social classifications can also determine the sporting activities that such classes take part in. It is suggested that those of an upper social class are more likely to take part in sporting activities, whereas those of a lower social background are less likely to participate in sport. However, upper-class people tend to not take part in certain sports that have been commonly known to be linked with the lower class.

=== Education ===
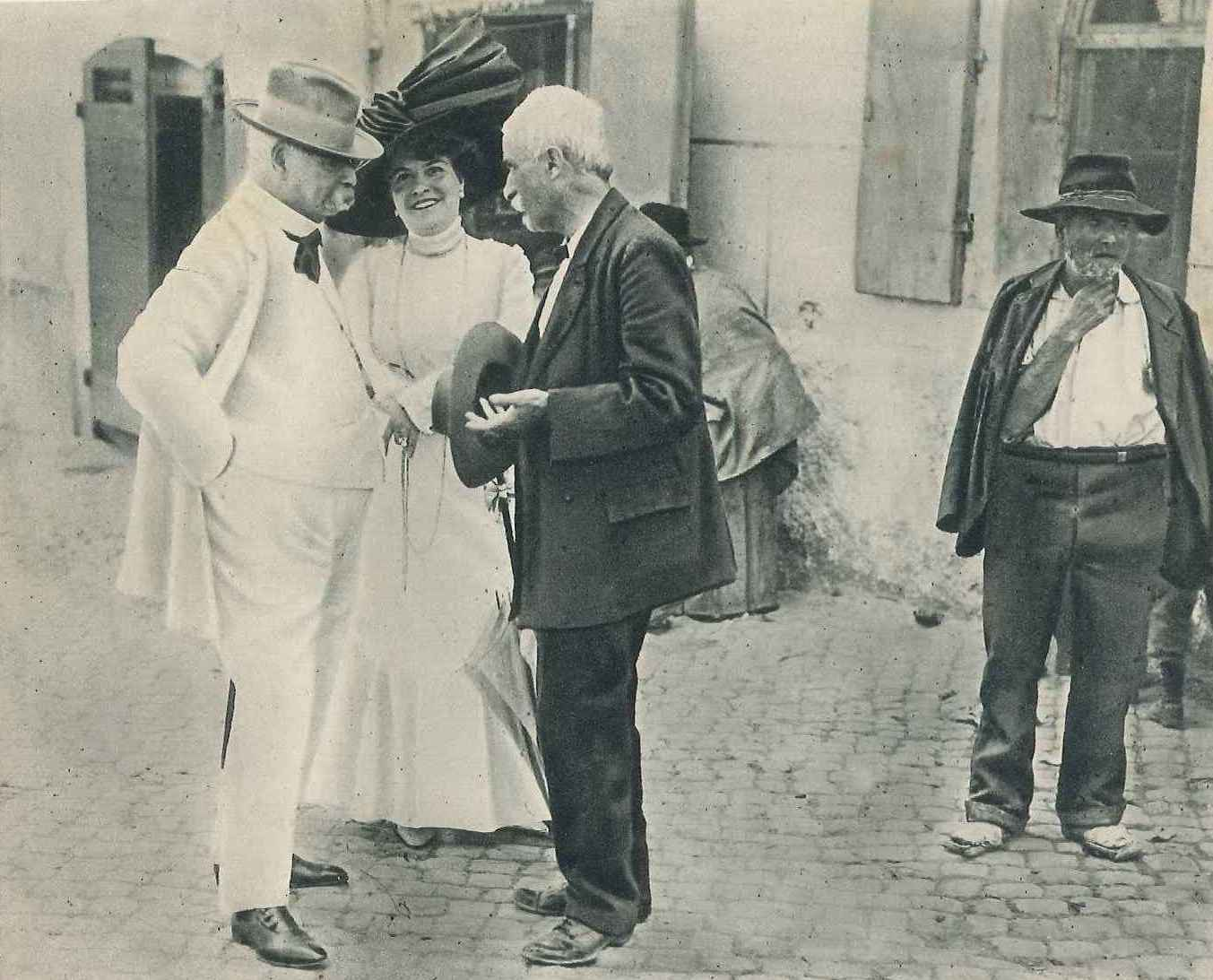
A physician consulted on the street by a farmer (Italy, ~1900)

A person's social class has a significant effect on their educational opportunities. Not only are upper-class parents able to send their children to exclusive schools that are perceived to be better, but in many places, state-supported schools for children of the upper class are of a much higher quality than those the state provides for children of the lower classes. This lack of good schools is one factor that perpetuates the class divide across generations.

Nevertheless, certain actions developed in schools, known as Successful Educational Actions, can avoid the continuation of this class divide, improving the outcomes of students and increasing their future employability.

In the UK, the educational consequences of class position have been discussed by scholars inspired by the cultural studies framework of the CCCS and/or, especially regarding working-class girls, feminist theory. On working-class boys, Paul Willis' 1977 book Learning to Labour: How Working Class Kids Get Working Class Jobs is seen within the British Cultural Studies field as a classic discussion of their antipathy to the acquisition of knowledge. Beverley Skeggs described Learning to Labour as a study on the "irony" of "how the process of cultural and economic reproduction is made possible by 'the lads' ' celebration of the hard, macho world of work".

=== Health and nutrition ===
A person's social class often affects their physical health, their ability to receive adequate medical care and nutrition and their life expectancy.

Lower-class people experience a wide array of health problems as a result of their economic status. They are unable to use health care as often and when they do it is of lower quality, even though they generally tend to experience a much higher rate of health issues. Lower-class families have higher rates of infant mortality, cancer, cardiovascular disease and disabling physical injuries. Additionally, poor people tend to work in much more hazardous conditions, yet generally have much less (if any) health insurance provided for them, as compared to middle- and upper-class workers.

=== Employment ===
The conditions at a person's job vary greatly depending on class. Those in the upper-middle class and middle class enjoy greater freedoms in their occupations. They are usually more respected, enjoy more diversity and are able to exhibit some authority. Those in lower classes tend to feel more alienated and have lower work satisfaction overall. The physical conditions of the workplace differ greatly between classes. While middle-class workers may "suffer alienating conditions" or "lack of job satisfaction", blue-collar workers are more apt to suffer alienating, often routine, work with obvious physical health hazards, injury and even death.

In the UK, a 2015 government study by the Social Mobility Commission suggested the existence of a "glass floor" in British society preventing those who are less able, but who come from wealthier backgrounds, from slipping down the social ladder. The report proposed a 35% greater likelihood of less able, better-off children becoming high earners than bright poor children.

== Class conflict ==
Class conflict, frequently referred to as class struggle, is the tension or antagonism which exists in society due to competing socioeconomic interests and desires between people of different classes.

For Marx, the history of class society was a history of class conflict. He pointed to the successful rise of the bourgeoisie and the necessity of revolutionary violence—a heightened form of class conflict—in securing the bourgeois rights that supported the capitalist economy.

Marx believed that the exploitation and poverty inherent in capitalism were a pre-existing form of class conflict. Marx believed that wage labourers would need to revolt to bring about a more equitable distribution of wealth and political power.

== Classless society ==
A "classless" society is one in which no one is born into a social class. Distinctions of wealth, income, education, culture or social network might arise and would only be determined by individual experience and achievement in such a society.

Since these distinctions are difficult to avoid, advocates of a classless society (such as anarchists and communists) propose various means to achieve and maintain it and attach varying degrees of importance to it as an end in their overall programs or philosophy.

== Relationship between ethnicity and class ==
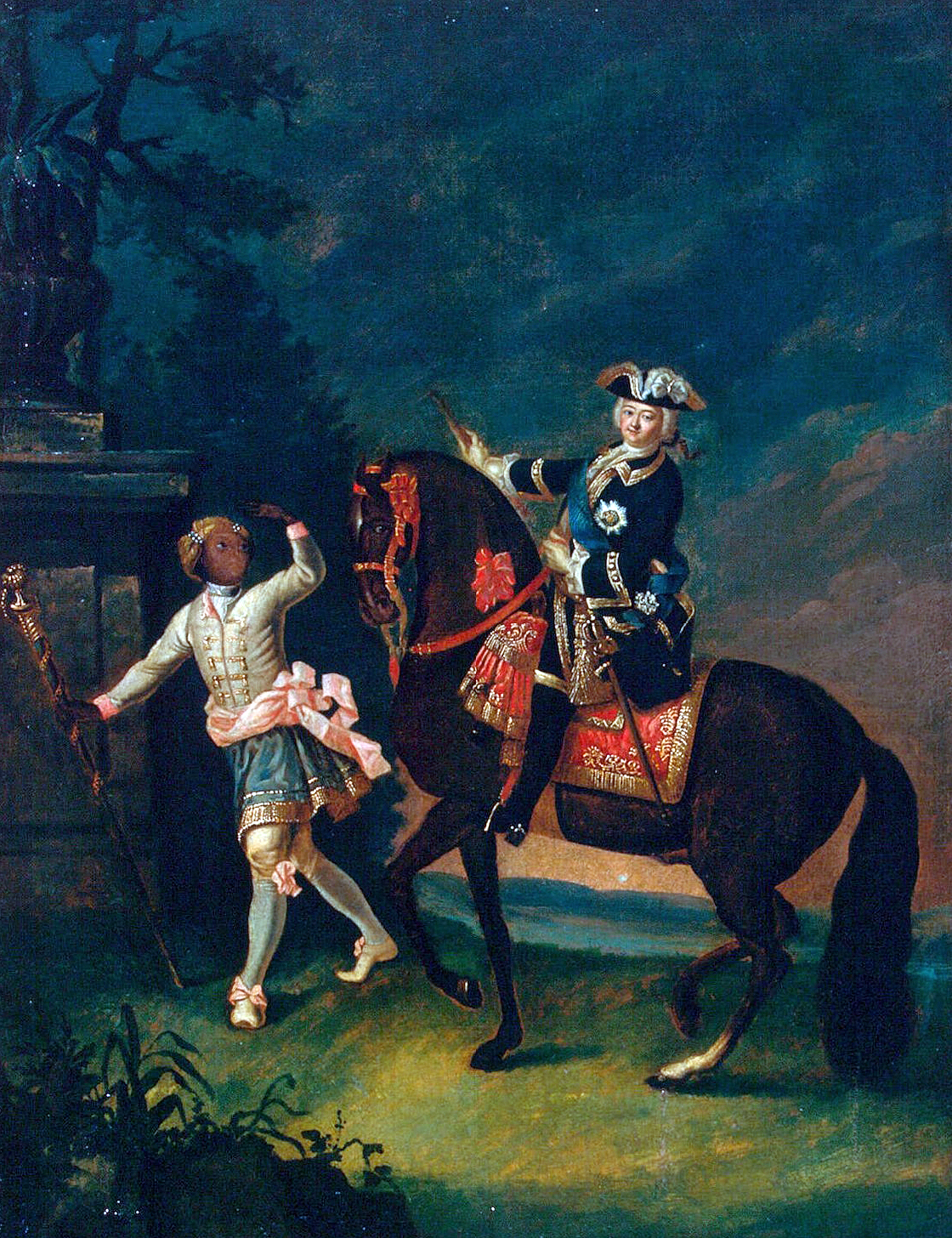
Equestrian portrait of Empress Elizabeth of Russia with a Moor servant

Race and other large-scale groupings can also influence class standing. The association of particular ethnic groups with class statuses is common in many societies, and is linked with race as well. Class and ethnicity can impact a person's or community's socioeconomic standing, which in turn influences everything including job availability and the quality of available health and education. The labels ascribed to an individual change the way others perceive them, with multiple labels associated with stigma combining to worsen the social consequences of being labelled.

As a result of conquest or internal ethnic differentiation, a ruling class is often ethnically homogenous and particular races or ethnic groups in some societies are legally or customarily restricted to occupying particular class positions. Which ethnicities are considered as belonging to high or low classes varies from society to society.

In modern societies, strict legal links between ethnicity and class have been drawn, such as the Caste systems in Africa, apartheid, the position of the Burakumin in Japanese society and the casta system in Latin America.

== See also ==
- Caste – Social stratification conferring status
- Class stratification – Form of social categorization
- Drift hypothesis – Relationship between mental illness and social class
- Elite theory – Theory of the state
- Elitism – Notion that elites deserve more influence
- Four occupations – Ancient Chinese classification of occupations
- Health equity – Social equity in health
- Hostile architecture – Civic design intended to exclude certain populations
- Inca society – Pre-Columbian civilization
- Mass society – Sociological concept
- National Statistics Socio-economic Classification
- Passing (sociology) – Ability to be regarded as having an identity one does not
- Post-industrial society – Service and knowledge-based society
- Psychology of social class – Branch of social psychology
- Ranked society – Society that ranks individuals by relation to chief
- Raznochintsy – Social estate in the Russian Empire
- Welfare state – Form of government

== Bibliography ==
- Ojämlikhetens dimensioner – Marie Evertsson & Charlotta Magnusson (red.) (in Swedish) ISBN 978-9147111299
- Om konsten att lyfta sig själv i håret och behålla barnet i badvattnet : kritiska synpunkter på samhällsvetenskapens vetenskapsteori – Israel, Joachim (in Swedish) ISBN 91-29-43746-6
- The inner level : how more equal societies reduce stress, restore sanity and improve everyone's well-being – Richard G Wilkinson; Kate Pickett ISBN 978-0141975399
- "Archived copy" (PDF). Archived from the original (PDF) on 29 April 2019.
