= Learning to Labour =

1977 book by Paul Willis about education

- The 1981 Morningside edition
- Author: Paul Willis
- Language: English
- Genre: Sociology
- Published: 1977
- Publisher: Saxon House (UK), Columbia University Press (US)
- Publication place: United Kingdom
- ISBN: 0-231-05357-6

Learning to Labour: How Working Class Kids Get Working Class Jobs is a 1977 book on education, written by British social scientist and cultural theorist Paul Willis. A Columbia University Press edition, titled the "Morningside Edition," was published in the United States shortly after its reception.

Willis's first major book, Learning to Labour relates the findings of his ethnographic study of working-class boys at a secondary school in England. In it, Willis attempts to explain the role of youths' culture and socialization as mediums by which schools route working-class students into working-class jobs. Stanley Aronowitz, in the preface to the Morningside edition, hails the book as a key text in Marxist social reproduction theory about education, advancing previous work in education studies by Samuel Bowles and Herbert Gintis's Schooling in Capitalist America, as well as work by Michael Apple and John Dewey.

Learning to Labour has been recognized by sociologists, critical pedagogues, and researchers in education studies as a landmark study of schooling and culture, and is one of the most cited sociological texts in education studies.

== Background ==
Learning to Labour represents Paul Willis's ethnographic fieldwork with twelve working-class British male students, attending their second-to-last year of schooling at "Hammertown Boys," a modern, boys-only school in a town in the British Midlands. Beginning in 1972, Willis followed the boys for approximately six months, observing their social behavior with each other and their school and interviewing them periodically. He also studied them at later points up until 1976. The makeup of Hammertown Boys, and Hammertown, is largely working-class, with some immigrants from South Asia and the West Indies. At the time of the study, the local school system was expanding its infrastructure and exploring new pedagogical methods, thanks to the implementation of the Raising of School Leaving Age policies in September 1972 that were in line with education reforms that sought to keep youth in schools for a greater span of time, as well as offer them opportunities for gainful employment and socioeconomic mobility.

Willis's research was made possible by funding through the Social Science Research Council. Willis acknowledged the advice and support of members of the Centre for Contemporary Cultural Studies at the University of Birmingham, including cultural theorist Stuart Hall, in writing in the book.

== Summary ==
Learning to Labour is organized into two sections: ethnography and analysis. In Part One, Willis describes and analyzes the nonconformist counter-school culture produced by Hammertown Boys' White, working-class boys (called "lads"). In this section, he applies thick description and ethnographic analysis to the counter-school culture of the lads, recognizing the legitimacy and reality of the students' own interpretive accounts of schooling. In Part Two, Willis analyzes his own ethnography to produce a theoretical account of how counter-school culture plays a vital role in leading working-class students into subordinate, low-wage labor positions in adult life, fulfilling what he calls their "self-damnation." Working-class youths' recognition of, and reaction against, the dominating, disciplinary mechanisms of school help seal their future outcomes as workers, in turn enabling the social reproduction of class positions.

=== Part One: Ethnography ===
Willis uses the qualitative research methods of participant observation and group interviews to study an informal (but socially cohesive) group of twelve lads at Hammertown Boys. He distinguishes between two distinct, informal groups of the working-class students at Hammertown Boys: lads and 'ear'oles. The lads informally socialise and organise themselves against the 'ear'oles and the school as an institution, producing a culture of nonconformity, rebellion, and opposition to their school's authority figures and strictures. It is not only important that the lads smoke and have sex with girls, but are seen to smoke and recognized to have had sexual liaisons. Behaviours that define the forms of this culture, such as playing pranks on teachers, harassing conformist students, and refusing to inform teachers of each other's behaviour, also build a sense of solidarity and identity among their group. The lads' culture is also patriarchal and racist, as girls and non-Whites are excluded from their informal group. It also strongly identifies with the actual, working-class environment from which it originates. In terms of working-class identity, their culture has much in common with the culture of working-class shop floors. This includes the active search for producing moments of excitement, disorder, and enjoyment in what is an otherwise boring, routine, and meaningless span of time of work for adult workers, and school discipline for students.

Over the course of their time as Hammertown Boys, the lads were recognised by school authorities as a distinct "anti-school group." However, when they were of age to legally leave school, in their fifth year in secondary school, few of them did. By this point, as the lads took career-preparation lessons in school, they rejected the legitimacy of formal credentials and qualifications, prizing instead manual labour as superior to and more authentic than mental labour. This inverted the lessons' insinuation of mental labour's being more desirable than manual labour by dint of its higher socioeconomic status. By the end of the ethnography, the lads were easily able to enter working-class jobs, including plumbing, bricklaying, and trainee machine work. However, half of them left their job for another after one year of work, and one was unable to find work at all. Willis ended the ethnographic study in autumn 1976, with the lads routed into working-class labour with little hope of rising into the middle class, even as they subjectively experienced manual labour and income as empowering. Willis writes:

There is also a sense in which, despite the ravages -- fairly well contained at this point anyway -- manual work stands for something and is a way of contributing to and substantiating a certain view of life which criticises, scorns and devalues others as well as putting the self, as they feel it, in some elusive way ahead of the game. These feelings arise precisely from a sense of their own labour power which has been learnt and truly appropriated as insight and self-advance within the depths of the counter-school culture as it develops specific class forms in the institutional context. It is difficult to think how attitudes of such strength and informal and personal validity could have been formed in any other way. It is they, not formal schooling, which carry 'the lads' over into a certain application to the productive process. In a sense, therefore, there is an element of self-domination in the acceptance of subordinate roles in western capitalism. However, this damnation is experienced, paradoxically, as a form of true learning, appropriation and as a kind of resistance.

=== Part Two: Analysis ===
In the second half of Learning to Labour, Willis synthesises his observations of the lads' counter-school culture at Hammertown Boys in order to produce a theory of social reproduction that integrates culture as a key element alongside education. He proposes that the working-class lads enter working-class jobs of their own apparent volition, but this is not to be understood as merely a psychological inclination toward these jobs, nor as merely the deterministic effect of capitalist ideology persuading them to select them. Rather, it is in school that the lads acquire a distorted class consciousness through their counter-school culture, in which they end up embracing working-class, manual labor as more affirming and authentic. A rebellious culture can successfully oppose the norms of capitalism transmitted in school, but the success is, in Willis's terms, a "pyrrhic victory," for they end up taking on working-class jobs as adults.

In his analysis, Willis defines and uses the following concepts:

- Teaching paradigm: The teaching paradigm is the principal set of demands and incentives used by the school system. According to this paradigm, students consent to behave obediently and in deference to their teacher in exchange for promised credentials that will help them move upward socioeconomically. This paradigm, which helps the teacher with authority, implies the desirability of obedience, deference, and conformity for working-class students, and recalls the banking paradigm in Paulo Freire's Pedagogy of the Oppressed. However, Willis notes the importance of teachers' winning from their students consent to the teaching paradigm, as their exchange-based authority does not permit them to directly impose it on students.
- Differentiation and integration: Willis describes differentiation as the process by which working-class students reinterpret, invert, criticize, and reject the teaching paradigm as failing to meet their objective interests as members of the working class. Aspects of differentiation constitute, in part, the lads' counter-school culture. Integration is the opposite of differentiation, the process by which agents of the school system, such as teachers, attempt to legitimise the role of schooling in improving students' lives. The tug-of-war between differentiation and integration is, in Willis's observation, continually manifested through day-to-day contests between teachers attempting to maintain their authority and lads attempting to subvert it.
- Penetration and limitation: These struggles between the lads and teachers occasionally lead to penetration, which denotes the lads' insights into their own class condition, as interpreted through the lens of their counter-school culture. It is through penetrations that working-class youth recognise the illusions of the teaching paradigm, and more generally of liberal democracy and capitalism's promises of advancement through education. Willis notes, however, that penetrations are, for anyone immersed in their own culture, partial and disorganised, meaning that they are culturally, subjectively distorted, and unable to bloom into politically radical class consciousness. Later, he describes this partiality as limitations. The limitations of penetrations grant the lads a sense of freedom, affirmation, solidarity, and empowerment in their rebellion and embrace of working-class identity. For example, that the lads understand the teaching paradigm's valuation of mental labour as superior to manual labour is a penetration; on the other hand, that they respond by culturally affirming manual labour over mental labour, as more sensual and authentic, shows the partiality of their perpetration. Willis also identifies limitations in the intersection of patriarchy and capitalism: The lads approach manual labour as a means to accomplish a masculine identity, and identify gender domestic labour and mental labour as girlish and "cissy."
- Ideology: Drawing on the theory of Louis Althusser and Antonio Gramsci, Willis argues that schools are also complicit in social reproduction as state institutions for ideology. Career counseling programs in secondary school emphasise individual competition, promote the desirability of white-collar labour, and reify adult work as an inevitable and natural stage of life. Ideology also has the power to undo any successful penetrations, by acknowledging the facts of economic inequality and domination in the workplace by bosses, without organising these facts in any kind of systematic framework of class, wage labour, and exploitation. Ideology and penetration are at odds, and help determine the degree to which working-class youth identify with the working class.

In Learning to Labour, the informal, creative, counter-school culture of the lads is vital to understanding the reproduction of class structure. Willis notes that working-class cultures are distinct in that they have no stake in subscribing to the dominant capitalist ideology, and therefore have the potential to subvert it. Yet it is this subversion that routes the lads into working-class labour, seemingly of their own volition. They use culture to explain and interpret the structures of schooling and work that enfold them, but doing so also steers them into social reproduction.

Willis warns against an overtly deterministic mode of social reproduction, encouraging the consideration of culture in a mediating role. He also warns against policy that would focus strictly on changing culture as a means to change material outcomes in education and labour. Learning to Labour ends with several practical suggestions for changing education accordingly, including:

- Recognising the competition inherent to an educational meritocracy
- Respecting the insights and logic of youth working-class culture
- Communicating to students without denigrating their social identities
- Discussing elements of students' own cultural forms, including wage labour, street fighting, sexism, and rebellion
- Recognising the limits of pedagogy and teaching paradigms in reaching disaffected working-class students, as well as the necessity of some authority in classrooms. Although Willis acknowledges the possibility of using radical pedagogical methods, he suggests they would be ineffective for students as the Hammertown Boys lads, who are likely to register a teacher's withdrawal from authority as simply their victory over him.

In his afterword to the Morningside Edition, Willis reflected that Learning to Labour contributed to the academic literature of education by advancing social reproduction theory and by asserting the complicity of both liberal educational policies and student in causing educational and socioeconomic inequality. While researchers must be skeptical of schools' purported role in improving social mobility, schools are not all-powerful in reproducing class:

There may be a justified skepticism about liberal claims in education, but the "Reproduction" perspective moves too quickly to a simple version of their opposite. Apparently, education unproblematically does the bidding of the capitalist economy by inserting working class agents into unequal futures ... The actually varied, complex, and creative field of human consciousness, culture, and capacity is reduced to the dry abstraction of structural determination. Capital requires it, therefore schools do it! Humans become dummies, dupes, or zombies. Their innermost sensibilities are freely drawn on. The school is even the main site for this cosmic drawing; for all we are told of how this actually happens, schools may as well be "black boxes." This will not do theoretically. It certainly will not do politically. Pessimism reigns supreme in this, the most spectacular of secular relations of pre-determination.

== Reception ==
Learning to Labour was received with wide acclaim. In the years after its original release, Willis discussed his research with a variety of educators and community groups, who provided both support and criticism. An anthology of essays, titled Learning to Labour in New Times, was published in 2004, growing from a 2002 American Educational Research Association meeting to recognise Learning to Labour's 25th anniversary. Jean Anyon, Michael Apple, Peter McLaren, and other academics contributed essays to the anthology, applying Willis's ethnography to contemporary issues of gender, race, neoliberalism, work precarity, globalisation, media, and mass incarceration in the United States. For instance, Black youth in United States schools develop cultures of oppositionality, collective identity, and "tough fronts," similar to the Hammertown lads, but are led to incarceration instead of working-class jobs. Learning to Labour has also been cited in later ethnographies of poor youth and economic inequality, such as Annette Lareau's Unequal Childhoods and Jay MacLeod's Ain't No Makin' It.

In the wider field of cultural studies, Learning to Labour was recognized as an important text in youth studies, as well as working-class leisure and culture, whereas other contemporaneous leftist research in the social sciences tended to foreground employment, labour unions, and political organizations.

Willis acknowledged that shortly after its first release, some right-wing policymakers and politicians sought to appropriate its findings to justify tracking and legitimate educational inequality. While Willis repudiated this use of his work, he even more strongly criticised well-intending, liberal policies that sought to extirpate counter-school cultures:

Besides, even in the worst case of interpretation and action taken on the book-the "oiling" paradigm-a cynical recognition of actual cultures is preferable to their attempted destruction as "pathological" cases, or their chimerical projection into shocking Satanic forms visited upon us from nowhere. "Solutions" based on such myths are likely to be cruel because their recipients were never seen as real people.

Willis further advanced concepts of profane, working-class youth culture and symbolic labour in his 1990 book Common Culture.

=== Criticism ===
Researchers in education and cultural studies, including Angela McRobbie, criticized Learning to Labour for neglecting girls and conformist male students in its study. McRobbie wrote that Willis's study took little concern with the overt and violent sexism of the lads falling into a wider pattern of cultural studies' failure to prioritise gender. In reply, Willis acknowledged this sexism, but replied that he had indeed incorporated a construction of working-class masculinity as "self-entrapment."

Willis's ethnography was also criticised for an unclear methodology, inviting questions of reliability and generalization as a "fish 'n' chips ethnography.'" Teachers also replied to Learning to Labour that cultures of resistance were absent in their own classrooms. In turn, Willis argued that such cultures are not immediately obvious, and may be interpreted as individualised behaviours. Moreover, studies of student culture require extensive fieldwork to generate validity, and quantitative methods such as surveys, which may produce greater reliability, cannot satisfactorily report on cultural forms.
