= Centre for Contemporary Cultural Studies =

Research centre at the University of Birmingham, England

The Centre for Contemporary Cultural Studies (CCCS) was a research centre at the University of Birmingham, England. It was founded in 1964 by Stuart Hall and Richard Hoggart, its first director. From 1964 to 2002, it played a critical role in developing the field of cultural studies.

== History ==
The centre was the focus for what became known internationally as the "Birmingham School" of cultural studies, or, more generally, British cultural studies. Dennis Dworkin writes that "a critical moment" in the beginning of cultural studies as a field was when Richard Hoggart used the term in 1964 in founding the CCCS, thus becoming the world's first institutional home of cultural studies.

Hoggart appointed as his assistant Stuart Hall, who would effectively be directing CCCS by 1968. Hall formally assumed the directorship of CCCS in 1971, when Hoggart left Birmingham to become Assistant Director-General of UNESCO. Thereafter, the field of cultural studies became closely associated with Hall's work. In 1979, Hall left Birmingham to accept a prestigious chair in sociology at the Open University, and Richard Johnson took over the directorship of the centre. Hall was succeeded by Richard Johnson (1980–1987).

The Birmingham CCCS approach to culture and politics evolved from a complex moment within British post-war history: the rise of the anti-Stalinist New Left; the promotion of adult education in Britain after World War II; the "Americanization" of British popular culture and the growth of mass communication in the decades after 1945; the growing multiculturalism of British society; and, the eventual influence within British academia of new critical methods such as semiotics and structuralism.

Drawing on a variety of influences (feminism, structuralism, Marxism—especially the work of Louis Althusser and Antonio Gramsci, sociology, critical race theory, and post-structuralism), over the course of several decades the Centre pioneered a variety of approaches to the study of culture, including: ideological analysis; studies of working-class cultures and subcultures; the role of media audiences; feminist cultural research; hegemonic struggles in state politics; and the place of race in social and cultural processes. Notable Centre books include Off-Centre: Feminism and Cultural Studies, Resistance through Rituals, The Empire Strikes Back, Border Patrols: Policing the Boundaries of Heterosexuality. The history of this development can be found in the series of stencilled occasional papers the Centre published between 1973 and 1988.

=== Stuart Hall's directorship of CCCS ===
Beginning in 1964, after the initial appearance of the founding works of British Cultural Studies in the late 1950s, Stuart Hall's pioneering work at CCCS, along with that of his colleagues and postgraduate students, gave shape and substance to the field of cultural studies. This would include such people as Paul Willis, Dick Hebdige, David Morley, Charlotte Brunsdon, John Clarke, Richard Dyer, Judith Williamson, Richard Johnson, Iain Chambers, Dorothy Hobson, Chris Weedon, Tony Jefferson, Michael Green, and Angela McRobbie. Many cultural studies scholars employed Marxist methods of analysis, exploring the relationships between cultural forms (i.e., the superstructure) and that of the political economy (i.e., the base). By the 1970s, the work of Louis Althusser had radically rethought the Marxist account of base and superstructure, significantly influencing the "Birmingham School". Much of the work done at CCCS examined youth subcultural expressions of antagonism toward "respectable" middle-class British culture in the post-WWII period. Also during the 1970s, the politically formidable British working classes were in decline. Britain's manufacturing industries, while continuing to grow in output and value, were decreasing in share of GDP and numbers employed, and union rolls were shrinking. Millions of working-class Britons backed the rise of Margaret Thatcher amid labour losses. For Stuart Hall and his colleagues, this shift in loyalty from the Labour Party to the Conservative Party had to be explained in terms of cultural politics, which they had been tracking even before Thatcher's first victory. Some of this work was presented in the cultural studies classic, Policing the Crisis, and in other later texts such as Hall's The Hard Road to Renewal: Thatcherism and the Crisis of the Left, and New Times: The Changing Face of Politics in the 1990s.

By the late 1970s, scholars associated with the Birmingham School had firmly placed questions of gender and race on the cultural studies agenda, where they have remained ever since.

=== Hall's cultural studies ===
Hall's cultural studies explores culture as a system that shapes individuals' identities through the meanings and practices arising from the constant power dynamics that comprise it. Hall viewed culture as a "critical site of social action and intervention, where power relations are both established and potentially unsettled." He perceived culture as a power dynamic in which the media unintentionally possesses more control over ideology than the public. Hall viewed the media as a source of preserving the status quo of a reflection that already exists in society. The media hegemony in question, he emphasized, "is not a conscious plot or conspiracy, it's not overtly coercive, and its effects are not total." Compared to other thinkers on this subject, he studied and analyzed symbols, ideologies, signs, and other representations within cultural studies. Most of his contributions occurred in the 1980s, where he looked at how media cultivates cultural power as well as how it is consumed, mediated and negotiated, etc. Hall has also been credited with the expansion of cultural studies through "the primacy of culture's role as an educational site where identities are being continually transformed, power is enacted, and learning assumes a political dynamic." He viewed politics as being used mainly for power instead of the betterment of society. This led to the belief that political dynamics could change with a reform in the education system (if one changes the education system, then one can change the culture). Hall viewed culture as something that is institutionalized, which could only be studied through the interactional patterns that people within a culture exhibit and experience. Culture is something that makes up society, is a learned trait, and is influenced by various forms of media that help to establish it. Power is the underlying tone of Hall's cultural studies. Hall believed that culture has some power, but the media's use of it is what sways and dictates culture itself.

== Noted staff members ==
The Centre produced many key studies and developed the careers of prominent researchers and academics.

- Stuart Hall, who became the centre's director in 1968, developed his seminal Encoding/Decoding model of communication here. Of special importance is the collective research that led to Policing the Crisis (1978), a study of law and order campaigns that focused on "mugging" (a code for street violence). This anticipated many of the law and order themes of Margaret Thatcher's Conservative government in the 1980s.
- David Morley and Charlotte Brunsdon pioneered the centre's approach to empirical research in The Nationwide Project.
- Angela McRobbie is a British sociologist and cultural theorist.
- Richard Johnson was later director and encouraged research in social and cultural history.

== Key works ==
- Richard Hoggart, The Uses of Literacy (1957)
- Stuart Hall and Paddy Whannell, The Popular Arts (1964)
- S.Hall and T.Jefferson, Resistance through Rituals: Youth Subcultures in Post-War Britain, London: Hutchinson, 1976.
- Paul Willis, Learning to Labour: How Working Class Kids Get Working Class Jobs (1977)
- S.Hall, C.Critcher, T.Jefferson, J.Clarke and B.Roberts,Policing the Crisis: "Mugging" the State and Law and Order, London: Macmillan, 1978.
- Dick Hebdige, Subculture: The Meaning of Style (1979)
- CCCS Education Group, Unpopular Education: Schooling and Social Democracy in England Since 1944 (1981)
- Centre for Contemporary Cultural Studies, The Empire Strikes Back: Race and Racism in 70s Britain (1982)

== Closure in 2002 ==
The new Department of Cultural Studies and Sociology was unexpectedly and abruptly closed in 2002, a move the university's senior management described as "restructuring". The immediate reason given for disestablishment of the new department was an unexpectedly low result in the UK's Research Assessment Exercise of 2001, though a dean from the university described the decision as a consequence of "inexperienced 'macho management'". Students and staff unsuccessfully campaigned to save the school, which gained considerable attention in the national press and sparked numerous letters of support from former alumni all over the world. Four of the department's 14 members of staff were to be "retained" and its hundreds of students (nearly 250 undergraduates and postgraduates at that time, many from abroad) to be transferred to other departments. In the ensuing dispute most department staff left.

=== Legacy ===
To mark the 50th anniversary of the CCCS's founding, the University of Birmingham—in collaboration with former members of staff at the centre, including Richard Johnson, Stuart Hall, and Michael Green—created an archive of CCCS-related material at the Cadbury Research Library at Birmingham. In 2016, Duke University Press launched a new series of Stuart Hall's collected writings, many of which detail his major and decisive contributions toward the establishment of the field of cultural studies. In 2023, a new Stuart Hall Archive Project was launched at the University of Birmingham to commemorate Hall's contributions in pioneering the field of cultural studies at CCCS.
