= Cultural studies =

Academic field

Cultural studies or cultural theory is an academic field that explores the dynamics of contemporary culture (including the politics of popular culture) and its social and historical foundations. Cultural studies researchers investigate how cultural practices relate to wider systems of power associated with, or operating through, social phenomena. These include ideology, class structures, national formations, ethnicity, sexual orientation, gender, and generation. Employing cultural analysis, cultural studies views cultures not as fixed, bounded, stable, and discrete entities, but rather as constantly interacting and changing sets of practices and processes.

British Marxist academics initially developed cultural studies in the late 1950s, 1960s, and 1970s, and it has since been taken up and transformed by scholars from many different disciplines around the world. Cultural studies is avowedly, and even radically, interdisciplinary and can sometimes be seen as anti-disciplinary. A key concern for cultural studies practitioners is the examination of the forces within and through which socially organized people conduct and participate in the construction of their everyday lives.

Cultural studies combines a variety of politically engaged critical approaches including semiotics, Marxism, feminist theory, ethnography, post-structuralism, postcolonialism, social theory, political theory, history, philosophy, literary theory, media theory, film/video studies, communication studies, political economy, translation studies, museum studies and art history and criticism to study cultural phenomena in various societies and historical periods. Cultural studies seeks to understand how meaning is generated, disseminated, contested, bound up with systems of power and control, and produced from the social, political, and economic spheres within a particular social formation or conjuncture. The movement has generated important theories of cultural hegemony and agency. Its practitioners attempt to explain and analyze the cultural forces related to and processes of globalization.

During the rise of neoliberalism in Britain and the US, cultural studies became a global phenomenon. It attracted the attention of many conservative opponents both within and beyond universities for a variety of reasons. A worldwide movement of students and practitioners, with a raft of scholarly associations and programs, annual international conferences, and publications, continues the work in this field today. Distinct approaches to cultural studies have emerged in different national and regional contexts.

== Overview ==
=== Sardar's characteristics ===
In his 1994 book, Introducing Cultural Studies, orientalist scholar Ziauddin Sardar lists the following five main characteristics of cultural studies:

- The objective of cultural studies is to understand culture in all its complex forms and to analyze the social and political context in which culture manifests itself.
- Cultural study is a site of both study/analysis and political criticism. For example, a cultural studies scholar would not only study an object, but may also connect this study to a larger political project.
- Cultural studies attempts to expose and reconcile constructed divisions of knowledge that purport to be grounded in nature.
- Cultural studies commits to an ethical evaluation of modern society.
- One aim of cultural studies could be to examine cultural practices and their relation to power, following critical theory. For example, a study of a subculture (such as white working-class youth in London) would consider their social practices against those of the dominant culture (in this example, the middle and upper classes who control the political and financial sectors that create policies affecting the well-being of white working-class youth).

== British cultural studies ==
Dennis Dworkin writes that "a critical moment" in the beginning of cultural studies as a field was when Richard Hoggart used the term in 1964 in founding the Centre for Contemporary Cultural Studies (CCCS) at the University of Birmingham. The centre would become home to the development of the intellectual orientation that has become known internationally as the "Birmingham School" of cultural studies, thus becoming the world's first institutional home of cultural studies.

Hoggart appointed as his assistant Stuart Hall, who would effectively be directing CCCS by 1968. Hall formally assumed the directorship of CCCS in 1971, when Hoggart left Birmingham to become Assistant Director-General of UNESCO. Thereafter, the field of cultural studies became closely associated with Hall's work. In 1979, Hall left Birmingham to accept a prestigious chair in sociology at the Open University, and Richard Johnson took over the directorship of the centre.

In the late 1990s, "restructuring" at the University of Birmingham led to the elimination of CCCS and the creation of a new Department of Cultural Studies and Sociology (CSS) in 1999. Then, in 2002, the university's senior administration abruptly announced the disestablishment of CSS, provoking a substantial international outcry. The immediate reason for the disestablishment of the new department was an unexpectedly low result in the UK's Research Assessment Exercise of 2001, though a dean from the university attributed the decision to "inexperienced 'macho management'." The RAE, a holdover initiative of the Margaret Thatcher-led British government of 1986, determines research funding for university programs.

To trace the development of British Cultural Studies, see, for example, the work of Richard Hoggart, E. P. Thompson, Raymond Williams, Stuart Hall, Paul Willis, Angela McRobbie, Paul Gilroy, David Morley, Charlotte Brunsdon, Richard Dyer, and others. There are also many published overviews of the historical development of cultural studies, including Graeme Turner's British Cultural Studies: An Introduction, 3rd Ed. and John Hartley's A Short History of Cultural Studies.

=== Stuart Hall's directorship of CCCS ===
Beginning in 1964, after the initial appearance of the founding works of British Cultural Studies in the late 1950s, Stuart Hall's pioneering work at CCCS, along with that of his colleagues and postgraduate students, gave shape and substance to the field of cultural studies. This would include such people as Paul Willis, Dick Hebdige, David Morley, Charlotte Brunsdon, John Clarke, Richard Dyer, Judith Williamson, Richard Johnson, Iain Chambers, Dorothy Hobson, Chris Weedon, Tony Jefferson, Michael Green, and Angela McRobbie. Many cultural studies scholars employed Marxist methods of analysis, exploring the relationships between cultural forms (i.e., the superstructure) and that of the political economy (i.e., the base). By the 1970s, the work of Louis Althusser had radically rethought the Marxist account of base and superstructure, significantly influencing the "Birmingham School". Much of the work done at CCCS examined youth subcultural expressions of antagonism toward "respectable" middle-class British culture in the post-WWII period. Also during the 1970s, the politically formidable British working classes were in decline. Britain's manufacturing industries, while continuing to grow in output and value, were decreasing in share of GDP and numbers employed, and union rolls were shrinking. Millions of working-class Britons backed the rise of Margaret Thatcher amid labour losses. For Stuart Hall and his colleagues, this shift in loyalty from the Labour Party to the Conservative Party had to be explained in terms of cultural politics, which they had been tracking even before Thatcher's first victory. Some of this work was presented in the cultural studies classic, Policing the Crisis, and in other later texts such as Hall's The Hard Road to Renewal: Thatcherism and the Crisis of the Left, and New Times: The Changing Face of Politics in the 1990s.

In 2016, Duke University Press launched a new series of Stuart Hall's collected writings, many of which detail his major and decisive contributions toward the establishment of the field of cultural studies. In 2023, a new Stuart Hall Archive Project was launched at the University of Birmingham to commemorate Hall's contributions in pioneering the field of cultural studies at CCCS.

=== Late-1970s and beyond ===
By the late 1970s, scholars associated with the Birmingham School had firmly placed questions of gender and race on the cultural studies agenda, where they have remained ever since. Also, by the late 1970s, cultural studies had begun to attract considerable international attention. It spread globally throughout the 1980s and 1990s. As it did so, it both encountered new conditions of knowledge production and engaged with other major international intellectual currents such as post-structuralism, postmodernism, and postcolonialism. The wide range of cultural studies journals now located throughout the world, as shown below, is one indication of the globalization of the field. For overviews of and commentaries on developments in cultural studies during the twenty-first century, see Lawrence Grossberg's Cultural Studies in the Future Tense, Gilbert Rodman's Why Cultural Studies?, and Graeme Turner's What's Become of Cultural Studies?

=== Hall's cultural studies ===
Hall's cultural studies explores culture as a system that shapes individuals' identities through the meanings and practices arising from the constant power dynamics that comprise it. Hall viewed culture as a "critical site of social action and intervention, where power relations are both established and potentially unsettled." He perceived culture as a power dynamic in which the media unintentionally possesses more control over ideology than the public. Hall viewed the media as a source of preserving the status quo of a reflection that already exists in society. The media hegemony in question, he emphasized, "is not a conscious plot or conspiracy, it's not overtly coercive, and its effects are not total." Compared to other thinkers on this subject, he studied and analyzed symbols, ideologies, signs, and other representations within cultural studies. Most of his contributions occurred in the 1980s, where he looked at how media cultivates cultural power as well as how it is consumed, mediated and negotiated, etc. Hall has also been credited with the expansion of cultural studies through "the primacy of culture's role as an educational site where identities are being continually transformed, power is enacted, and learning assumes a political dynamic." He viewed politics as being used mainly for power instead of the betterment of society. This led to the belief that political dynamics could change with a reform in the education system (if one changes the education system, then one can change the culture). Hall viewed culture as something that is institutionalized, which could only be studied through the interactional patterns that people within a culture exhibit and experience. Culture is something that makes up society, is a learned trait, and is influenced by various forms of media that help to establish it. Power is the underlying tone of Hall's cultural studies. Hall believed that culture has some power, but the media's use of it is what sways and dictates culture itself.

== Developments outside the UK ==
In the US, before the emergence of British cultural studies, several versions of cultural analysis had emerged largely from pragmatic and liberal-pluralist philosophical traditions. However, in the late 1970s and 1980s, when British cultural studies began to spread internationally, and to engage with feminism, post-structuralism, postmodernism, and race, critical cultural studies (i.e., Marxist, feminist, post-structuralist, etc.) expanded tremendously in American universities in fields such as communication studies, education, sociology, and literature. Cultural Studies, the flagship journal of the field, has been based in the US since its founding editor, John Fiske, brought it there from Australia in 1987.

A thriving cultural studies scene has existed in Australia since the late 1970s, when several key cultural studies practitioners emigrated there from the UK, bringing British cultural studies with them, after Margaret Thatcher became Prime Minister of the UK in 1979. A school of cultural studies known as cultural policy studies is one of the distinctive Australian contributions to the field, though it is not the only one. Australia also gave birth to the world's first professional cultural studies association (now known as the Cultural Studies Association of Australasia) in 1990. Cultural studies journals based in Australia include International Journal of Cultural Studies, Continuum: Journal of Media & Cultural Studies, and Cultural Studies Review.

In Canada, cultural studies has sometimes focused on issues of technology and society, continuing the emphasis in the work of Marshall McLuhan, Harold Innis, and others. Cultural studies journals based in Canada include Topia: Canadian Journal of Cultural Studies.

In Africa, human rights and third-world issues are among the central topics treated. There is a thriving cultural and media studies scholarship in Southern Africa, with its locus in South Africa and Zimbabwe. Cultural studies journals based in Africa include the Journal of African Cultural Studies.

In Latin America, cultural studies have drawn on thinkers such as José Martí, Ángel Rama, and other Latin American figures, as well as on Western theoretical sources associated with cultural studies elsewhere. Leading Latin American cultural studies scholars include Néstor García Canclini, Jésus Martín-Barbero, and Beatriz Sarlo. Among the key issues addressed by Latin American cultural studies scholars are decoloniality, urban cultures, and postdevelopment theory. Latin American cultural studies journals include the Journal of Latin American Cultural Studies.

Even though cultural studies developed much more rapidly in the UK than in continental Europe, it is well established in countries such as France, Spain, and Portugal. The field is relatively undeveloped in Germany, probably due to the continued influence of the Frankfurt School which is now often said to be in its third generation, and includes notable figures such as Axel Honneth. Cultural studies journals based in continental Europe include the European Journal of Cultural Studies, the Journal of Spanish Cultural Studies, French Cultural Studies, and Portuguese Cultural Studies.

In Germany, the term cultural studies specifically refers to the field in the Anglosphere, especially British cultural studies, to differentiate it from the German Kulturwissenschaft which developed along different lines and is characterized by its distance from political science. However, Kulturwissenschaft and cultural studies are often used interchangeably, particularly by lay people.

Throughout Asia, cultural studies have thrived since at least the beginning of the 1990s. Cultural studies journals based in Asia include Inter-Asia Cultural Studies. In India, the Centre for the Study of Culture and Society in Bangalore and the Department of Cultural Studies at the English and Foreign Languages and the University of Hyderabad are two major institutional spaces for Cultural Studies. In Japan, the Association for Cultural Typhoon, an academic society for cultural studies, publishes The Annual Review of Cultural Studies.

== Issues, concepts, and approaches ==
Marxism has been an important influence on cultural studies. Those associated with CCCS initially engaged deeply with the structuralism of Louis Althusser and, later in the 1970s, turned decisively toward Antonio Gramsci. Cultural studies has also embraced the examination of race, gender, and other aspects of identity, as is illustrated, for example, by some key books published collectively under the name of CCCS in the late 1970s and early 1980s, including Women Take Issue: Aspects of Women's Subordination (1978), and The Empire Strikes Back: Race and Racism in 70s Britain (1982).

=== Gramsci and hegemony ===
To understand the changing political circumstances of class, politics, and culture in the United Kingdom, scholars at the Birmingham School turned to the work of Antonio Gramsci, an Italian thinker, writer, and Communist Party leader. Gramsci had been concerned with similar issues: why would Italian laborers and peasants vote for fascists? What strategic approach is necessary to mobilize popular support in more progressive directions? Gramsci modified classical Marxism and argued that culture must be understood as a key site of political and social struggle. In his view, capitalists not only used brute force (police, prisons, repression, military) to maintain control, but also penetrated the everyday culture of working people in a variety of ways in their efforts to win popular "consent".

For Gramsci, historical leadership, or hegemony, involves the formation of alliances between class factions, and struggles within the cultural realm of everyday common sense. Hegemony was always, for Gramsci, an interminable, unstable, and contested process.

Scott Lash writes:

In the work of Hall, Hebdige and McRobbie, popular culture came to the fore... What Gramsci gave to this was the importance of consent and culture. If the fundamental Marxists saw the power in terms of class-versus-class, then Gramsci gave to us a question of class alliance. The rise of cultural studies itself was based on the decline of the prominence of fundamental class-versus-class politics.

Edgar and Sedgwick write:

The theory of hegemony was of central importance to the development of British cultural studies, particularly the Birmingham School. It facilitated the analysis of the ways subordinate groups actively resist and respond to political and economic domination. The subordinate groups needed not to be seen merely as the passive dupes of the dominant class and its ideology.

=== Structure and agency ===
The development of hegemony theory in cultural studies was, in some ways, consonant with work in other fields exploring agency, a theoretical concept that emphasizes the active, critical capacities of subordinated people (e.g., the working classes, colonized peoples, women). As Stuart Hall famously argued in his 1981 essay, "Notes on Deconstructing 'the Popular'": "ordinary people are not cultural dopes." Insistence on accounting for the agency of subordinated people runs counter to the work of traditional structuralists. Some analysts have, however, been critical of certain work in cultural studies that they feel overstates the significance of, or even romanticizes, some forms of popular cultural agency.

Cultural studies often concerns itself with agency at the level of everyday practices, and approaches such research from a standpoint of radical contextualism. In other words, cultural studies rejects universal accounts of cultural practices, meanings, and identities.

Judith Butler, an American feminist theorist whose work is often associated with cultural studies, wrote that:

the move from a structuralist account in which capital is understood to structure social relations in relatively homologous ways to a view of hegemony in which power relations are subject to repetition, convergence, and rearticulation brought the question of temporality into the thinking of structure. It has marked a shift from a form of Althusserian theory that takes structural totalities as theoretical objects to one in which the insights into the contingent possibility of structure inaugurate a renewed conception of hegemony as bound up with the contingent sites and strategies of the rearticulation of power.

=== Globalization ===
In recent decades, as capitalism has spread throughout the world via contemporary forms of globalization, cultural studies has generated important analyses of local sites and practices of negotiation with and resistance to Western hegemony.

=== Cultural consumption ===
Cultural studies criticizes the traditional view of the passive consumer, particularly by underlining the different ways people read, receive, and interpret cultural texts, or appropriate other kinds of cultural products, or otherwise participate in the production and circulation of meanings. A consumer can appropriate, actively rework, or challenge the meanings circulated through cultural texts. In some of its variants, cultural studies has shifted the analytical focus from traditional understandings of production to consumption – viewed as a form of production (of meanings, of identities, etc.) in its own right. Stuart Hall, John Fiske, and others have been influential in these developments.

A special 2008 issue of the field's flagship journal, Cultural Studies, examined "anti-consumerism" from a variety of cultural studies angles. Jeremy Gilbert noted in the issue that cultural studies must grapple with the fact that "we now live in an era when, throughout the capitalist world, the overriding aim of government economic policy is to maintain consumer spending levels. This is an era when 'consumer confidence' is treated as the key indicator and cause of economic effectiveness."

=== Concept of "text" ===
Cultural studies, drawing upon and developing semiotics, uses the concept of text to designate not only written language, but also television programs, films, photographs, fashion, hairstyles, and so forth; the texts of cultural studies comprise all the meaningful artifacts of culture. This conception of textuality derives especially from the work of the pioneering and influential semiotician, Roland Barthes, but also owes debts to other sources, such as Juri Lotman and his colleagues from the Tartu–Moscow School. Similarly, the field broadens the concept of culture. Cultural studies approaches the sites and spaces of everyday life, such as pubs, living rooms, gardens, and beaches, as "texts".

Culture, in this context, includes not only high culture, but also everyday meanings and practices, a central focus of cultural studies.

Jeff Lewis summarized much of the work on textuality and textual analysis in his cultural studies textbook and a post-9/11 monograph on media and terrorism. According to Lewis, textual studies use complex and difficult heuristic methods and require both powerful interpretive skills and a subtle conception of politics and contexts. The task of the cultural analyst, for Lewis, is to engage with both knowledge systems and texts, and to observe and analyze how the two interact. This engagement represents the critical dimensions of the analysis, its capacity to illuminate the hierarchies within and surrounding the given text and its discourse.

== Academic reception ==
Cultural studies has evolved through its uptake across a variety of different disciplines—anthropology, media studies, communication studies, literary studies, education, geography, philosophy, sociology, politics, and others.

While some have accused certain areas of cultural studies of meandering into political relativism and a kind of empty version of "postmodern" analysis, others hold that at its core, cultural studies provides a significant conceptual and methodological framework for cultural, social, and economic critique. This critique is designed to "deconstruct" the meanings and assumptions that are inscribed in the institutions, texts, and practices that work with and through, and produce and represent, culture. Thus, while some scholars and disciplines have dismissed cultural studies for its methodological rejection of disciplinarity, its core strategies of critique and analysis have influenced areas of the social sciences and humanities; for example, cultural studies work on forms of social differentiation, control and inequality, identity, community-building, media, and knowledge production has had a substantial impact. Moreover, the influence of cultural studies has become increasingly evident in areas as diverse as translation studies, health studies, international relations, development studies, computer studies, economics, archaeology, and neurobiology.

Cultural studies has also diversified its interests and methodologies, incorporating a range of studies on media policy, democracy, design, leisure, tourism, warfare, and development. While certain key concepts such as ideology or discourse, class, hegemony, identity, and gender remain significant, cultural studies has long engaged with and integrated new concepts and approaches. The field thus continues to pursue political critique through its engagements with the forces of culture and politics.

== Integration of popular culture in cultural studies and education ==
The integration of popular culture in classrooms has influenced educational practices in cultural studies. By analyzing TV series, movies, memes, and other cultural materials, educators can encourage media literacy, critical thinking, and a deeper understanding of social issues. Incorporating popular culture into education through cultural studies helps students critically engage with the world around them, fostering media literacy and critical thinking. Educators can use cultural texts to discuss societal issues, challenge norms, and prepare students for active participation in a media-dominated world.

Popular culture can be an effective tool for critical pedagogy. Evan Faidley explores how TV shows, movies, and memes can be used in the classroom to discuss topics like social justice and identity. Shows like South Park allow students to evaluate societal norms and political issues, using a pedagogy of resistance. Cultural studies encourages students to analyze intertextuality. Patricia Duff discusses how popular culture incorporates with academic discourse to build media literacy, which helps students critically engage with the media they consume daily. Kathy Mills also highlights the importance of multiliteracies, which encourages students to utilize a variety of communication media outside of the standard text, including digital and visual media. Diane Penrod argues that incorporating popular culture in education makes learning more relevant and engaging. Teachers can help students understand difficult concepts such as gender, ethnicity, and class by using works from their own cultures. Students are also encouraged to develop critical analytical abilities, which they can use in both academic and everyday situations when popular culture is integrated into the classroom.

=== Literary scholars ===
Many cultural studies practitioners work in departments of English or comparative literature. Nevertheless, some traditional literary scholars such as Yale professor Harold Bloom have been outspoken critics of cultural studies. At the methodological level, these scholars dispute the theoretical underpinnings of the movement's critical framework.

Bloom stated his position during the September 3, 2000 episode of C-SPAN's Booknotes, while discussing his book How to Read and Why:

[T]here are two enemies of reading now in the world, not just in the English-speaking world. One [is] the lunatic destruction of literary studies...and its replacement by what is called cultural studies in all of the universities and colleges in the English-speaking world, and everyone knows what that phenomenon is. I mean, the...now-weary phrase 'political correctness' remains a perfectly good descriptive phrase for what has gone on and is, alas, still going on almost everywhere and which dominates, I would say, rather more than three-fifths of the tenured faculties in the English-speaking world, who really do represent treason of the intellectuals, I think, a 'betrayal of the clerks'."

Marxist literary critic Terry Eagleton is not wholly opposed to cultural studies, but has criticized aspects of it and highlighted what he sees as its strengths and weaknesses in books such as After Theory (2003). For Eagleton, literary and cultural theory have the potential to say important things about the "fundamental questions" in life, but theorists have rarely realized this potential.

English departments also host cultural rhetorics scholars. This academic field defines cultural rhetorics as "the study and practice of making meaning and knowledge with the belief that all cultures are rhetorical and all rhetorics are cultural." Cultural rhetorics scholars are interested in investigating topics like climate change, autism, Asian American rhetoric, and more.

=== Sociology ===
Cultural studies have also had a substantial impact on sociology. For example, when Stuart Hall left CCCS at Birmingham, it was to accept a prestigious professorship in Sociology at the Open University in the UK. The subfield of cultural sociology, in particular, is the disciplinary home to many cultural studies practitioners. Nevertheless, there are some differences between sociology as a discipline and the field of cultural studies as a whole. While sociology was founded on various historical works that purposefully distinguished the subject from philosophy or psychology, cultural studies have explicitly interrogated and criticized traditional understandings and practices of disciplinarity. Most cultural studies practitioners think it is best that cultural studies neither emulate disciplines nor aspire to disciplinarity. Rather, they promote a radical interdisciplinarity as the basis for cultural studies.

One sociologist whose work has had a major influence on cultural studies is Pierre Bourdieu, whose work makes innovative use of statistics and in-depth interviews. However, although Bourdieu's work has been highly influential within cultural studies, and although Bourdieu regarded his work as a form of science, cultural studies has never embraced the idea that it should aspire toward "scientificity", and has marshaled a wide range of theoretical and methodological arguments against the fetishization of "scientificity" as a basis for cultural studies.

Two sociologists who have been critical of cultural studies, Chris Rojek and Bryan S. Turner, argue in their article, "Decorative sociology: towards a critique of the cultural turn," that cultural studies, particularly the flavor championed by Stuart Hall, lacks a stable research agenda, and privileges the contemporary reading of texts, thus producing an ahistorical theoretical focus. Many, however, would argue, following Hall, that cultural studies have always sought to avoid establishing a fixed research agenda; this follows from its critique of disciplinarity. Moreover, Hall and many others have long argued against the misunderstanding that textual analysis is the sole methodology of cultural studies, and have practiced numerous other approaches, as noted above. Rojek and Turner also level the accusation that there is "a sense of moral superiority about the correctness of the political views articulated" in cultural studies.

=== Science wars ===
In 1996, physicist Alan Sokal expressed his opposition to cultural studies by submitting a hoax article to a cultural studies journal, Social Text. The article, crafted as a parody of what Sokal called the "fashionable nonsense" of postmodernism, was accepted by the journal's editors, who at the time did not practice peer review. When the paper appeared in print, Sokal published a second article in a self-described "academic gossip" magazine, Lingua Franca, revealing his hoax on Social Text. Sokal stated that his motivation stemmed from his rejection of contemporary critiques of scientific rationalism:

Politically, I'm angered because most (though not all) of this silliness is emanating from the self-proclaimed Left. We're witnessing here a profound historical volte-face. For most of the past two centuries, the Left has been identified with science and against obscurantism; we have believed that rational thought and the fearless analysis of objective reality (both natural and social) are incisive tools for combating the mystifications promoted by the powerful – not to mention being desirable human ends in their own right. The recent turn of many "progressive" or "leftist" academic humanists and social scientists toward one or another form of epistemic relativism betrays this worthy heritage and undermines the already fragile prospects for progressive social critique. Theorizing about "the social construction of reality" won't help us find an effective treatment for AIDS or devise strategies for preventing global warming. Nor can we combat false ideas in history, sociology, economics and politics if we reject the notions of truth and falsity.

In response to this critique, Jacques Derrida wrote:

In whose interest was it to go for a quick practical joke rather than taking part in the work which, sadly, it replaced?

== Founding works ==
Hall and others have identified some core originating texts, or the original "curricula", of the field of cultural studies:

- Richard Hoggart's The Uses of Literacy
- Raymond Williams' Culture and Society and The Long Revolution
- E. P. Thompson's The Making of the English Working Class

== See also ==
- Culturology
- Cultural Studies Association (US)
- European Communication Research and Education Association (Norway)
- International Association for Translation and Intercultural Studies (South Korea)
- Popular culture studies
