= Cultural Studies Association =

The Cultural Studies Association (CSA) was founded in 2003 and is a non-profit membership association for scientific purposes in the field and discipline of cultural studies. Located in Chicago, IL, US, the CSA is headed by an executive committee of American academics who guide the association's efforts to promote the exchange of ideas between scholars, hold annual conferences, and publish an educational journal.

== Divisions ==
As of 2009, the CSA had the following divisions:

Critical Feminist Studies

Critical Feminist Studies dedicates itself to work that builds upon, even as it critiques, the institutions and practices of Women's and Gender Studies, focusing in particular on transnational formations and movements, queer and sexuality studies, and politics, practices, and representations. Sarah Rasmusson and Sabrina Starnaman (co-chairs)

Cultural Studies and Film

The Cultural Studies and Film division pursues the history and cultural politics of cinema and of related media. Approaches include film theory, ethnography, political economy, and textual analysis. Evan Heimlich (chair)

Cultural Studies and Literature

Socio-historical constructions of certain pleasures, knowledge, and experience in literature are often naturalized under the rubric of "fiction." As such, the section on Cultural Studies and Literature calls for a reading of literature that highlights its historical engagement in the social construction of knowledge and interpretation of experience. Helen Kapstein and Caroline H. Yang (co-chairs)

Cultural Policy and Legal Studies

The cultural policy and legal studies division is concerned with the historical and contemporary processes and institutions regulating and supporting culture in public life. Bridging practice and theory, this division welcomes scholarly and activist work that addresses the wide range of government and industry policies that shape cultural industries in global, national, and local contexts. Particular attention is paid to questions of social inequality and cultural justice. Joseph L. Terry (chair)

Environment, Space and Place

The CSA Division on Environment, Space and Place spans the union of cultural studies and geography. Approaching culture as spatial allows for powerful analyses of dominance and resistance, style, consumption, identity, ideology, as well as human-environment relations. Space and place—and representations thereof in various media—both result from and reassert force on culture. The Division welcomes discussion in all areas pertaining to environment, space and place, past and present, and encourages interdisciplinary consideration of these topics. Douglas Herman (chair)

Media Interventions

The Media Interventions Division provides an interdisciplinary forum for scholarship and activism related to alternative, citizens, community, and DIY media. The Division promotes theoretical development in the realm of interventionist media form, content, and practices. In addition, the Division welcomes practitioner perspectives on the intersection between cultural studies, political economy, and prefigurative media politics. Kevin Howley (chair)

Pedagogy (In Hiatus)

The pedagogy division includes a focus on culture and education, cultural pedagogy, and the curriculum of cultural studies. Pedagogy, broadly conceived and critically understood in this context concerns a wide range of issues taken up in cultural studies including but not limited to mass media, popular culture, subculture, public culture, nationhood, postcolonialism, political economy, identity, race, class, gender, sexuality.

Racial and Ethnic Studies

The purpose of the Racial and Ethnic Studies Division is to serve as a vehicle to mobilize the production and interrogation of research, theory, teaching, and activism directly concerned with race and ethnicity and their various dimensions (e.g., age, class, culture, economy, education, gender, history, labor, migration, nationality, politics, religion, and sexuality, among many others). Toward these ends, the encouragement of scholarly collaboration across and between disciplinary, methodological, and theoretical boundaries shall be promoted. Matthew W. Hughey (chair)

Technology

The Cultural Studies Association Technology Division is concerned with critical, in-depth examinations of technologies of all kinds. While technology related studies of mediated environments, gender, sexuality, race/ethnicity, identity, information, prosthetics, pharmaceuticals, medicine, genomics, distributed consciousness, agricultural technologies and embodiment are among some of the particular contexts investigated, we do not wish to limit the division to the study of media, popular culture and computer technologies. The division is therefore concerned with the critical examination of socio-political contextual analyses of technocultures. The division is particularly interested in the historicizing of technologies old and new, ethnographies of techno-mediated environments whether in rural, urban or digital environments. The division is interested in theory building based in the examination of technologies whether old or new, rural, urban or digital. Radhika Gajjala (chair) and Steve Luber (vice chair)

Theories of Cultural Studies

The Division of Theories of Cultural Studies is interested in promoting a broad range of theoretical work that includes not only theories of culture and its practices but also theoretical work in other areas such as politics, philosophy, language and literature studies, art, etc. as they intersect with cultural studies. Henry Krips (chair)

Visual Culture

The CSA Visual Culture Division represents the multi- and inter-disciplinary study of the visual as a primary site for the production and contestation of meaning. The Division is thus concerned with visual forms and visuality, including images, visual media, image technologies, surveillance, theories of spectatorship, visual experience, and visual literacy.

== Lateral: Journal of the Cultural Studies Association ==
Lateral was founded in 2012 as a digital journal and production site designed to foster experimentation and collaboration among cultural studies practitioners and researchers. Early issues of the journal were organized around research threads that considered knowledge formations, institutional and material location, and political intervention and implication. These threads included Theory and Method; Creative Industries; Universities in Question; and Mobilisations, Interventions, and Cultural Policy.

In 2017, the journal began publishing book reviews of recent titles relevant to cultural studies.

In addition to full-length articles, Lateral regularly publishes forums consisting of shorter, multimedia pieces written as tools for tools for conversation, education, and agitation. Past forums have included Emergent Critical Analytics for Alternative Humanities (2015–16), Universal Basic Income (2018–19), Gun Culture (2020), and Cultural Constructions of Race and Racism in the Middle East and North Africa / Southwest Asia and North Africa (MENA/SWANA)(2021).

Special issues of the journal have included Performance: Circulations and Relations (2015), Leveraging Justice (2016), Not a Trump Issue (2017), and Marxism and Cultural Studies (2018).

== See also ==
- Cultural geography
- Cultural history
- Modern Language Association
