= French Cultural Studies =

- Discipline: Cultural Studies
- Language: English
- Edited by: Nicholas Hewitt

Publication details
- History: 1990 – present
- Publisher: SAGE Publications
- Frequency: Quarterly
- Impact factor: 0.128 (2010)

Standard abbreviations
- ISO 4: Fr. Cult. Stud.

Indexing
- ISSN: 0957-1558 (print); 1740-2352 (web)
- LCCN: 95648448
- OCLC no.: 55103442

Links
- Journal homepage; Online access; Online archive

French Cultural Studies is a peer-reviewed academic journal that publishes papers in the field of Cultural Studies. The journal's editor is Nicholas Hewitt (University of Nottingham). It has been in publication since 1990 and is currently published by SAGE Publications.

== Scope ==
French Cultural Studies is a journal which seeks to address key changes that have affected aspects of the study of French culture, language and society in the education system. It aims to provide a forum for a range of work currently being done on French culture. The journal also includes work on the study of literature. However, the main focus of the journal of on areas such as cinema, television, media and the press, the visual arts, popular culture, and cultural and intellectual debate. The journal covers cultural history, from the French Revolution to the present.

== Abstracting and indexing ==
French Cultural Studies is abstracted and indexed in, among other databases: Academic Search Premier, the British Humanities Index, SCOPUS, and the Social Sciences Citation Index. According to the Journal Citation Reports, its 2010 impact factor is 0.128, ranking it 9th out of 10 journals in the category 'Cultural Studies'.
