= Richard Hoggart =

English sociologist

Richard Hoggart FRSL
- Born: Herbert Richard Hoggart; 24 September 1918; Potternewton, Leeds, England
- Died: 10 April 2014 (aged 95); London, England
- Occupation: Academic
- Known for: The distinction between popular culture and mass culture
- Children: 3, including Simon and Paul

Academic background
- Education: University of Leeds

Academic work
- School or tradition: Birmingham School of Cultural Studies; New Left
- Institutions: Birmingham University

Herbert Richard Hoggart (24 September 1918 – 10 April 2014) was an English academic whose career covered the fields of sociology, English literature and cultural studies, with emphasis on British popular culture.

== Early life ==
Hoggart was born in the Potternewton area of Leeds, one of three children in an impoverished family. His father, Tom Longfellow Hoggart (1880–1922), the son of a boilermaker, was a regular infantry soldier and housepainter who died of brucellosis when Hoggart was a year old, and his mother Adeline died of a chest illness when he was eight. He grew up with his grandmother in Hunslet, and was encouraged in his education by an aunt. Emulating his elder brother, Tom, the first of the family to go to a grammar school, he gained a place at Cockburn High School which was a grammar school, after his headmaster requested that the education authority reread his scholarship examination essay. He then won a scholarship to study English at the University of Leeds, where he graduated with a first class degree. He served with the Royal Artillery during World War II and was discharged as a staff captain.

== Career ==
He was a staff tutor at the University of Hull from 1946 to 1959, and published his first book, a study of W. H. Auden's poetry, in 1951. His major work, The Uses of Literacy, was published in 1957. Partly autobiography, the volume was interpreted as lamenting the loss of an authentic working class popular culture in Britain, and denouncing the imposition of a mass culture through advertising, media and Americanisation.

He became Senior Lecturer in English at the University of Leicester from 1959 to 1962. Hoggart was an expert witness at the Lady Chatterley trial in 1960, and his argument that it was an essentially moral and "puritan" work, which merely repeated words he had heard on a building site on his way to the court, is sometimes viewed as having had a decisive influence on the outcome of the trial.

While Professor of English at Birmingham University between 1962 and 1973, he founded the institution's Centre for Contemporary Cultural Studies in 1964 and was its director until 1969. Hoggart was Assistant Director-General (for Social Sciences, Human Sciences, and Culture) of UNESCO (1971–1975) and finally Warden of Goldsmiths, University of London (1976–1984), after which he retired from formal academic life. The Main Building at Goldsmiths has now been renamed the "Richard Hoggart Building" in tribute to his contributions to the college.

Hoggart was a member of numerous public bodies and committees, including the Albemarle Committee on Youth Services (1958–1960), the Pilkington Committee on Broadcasting (1960–1962), the Arts Council of Great Britain (1976–1981) and the Statesman and Nation Publishing Company Ltd (1977–1981). He was also Chairman of the Advisory Council for Adult and Continuing Education (1977–1983), and the Broadcasting Research Unit (1981–1991), as well as a Governor of the Royal Shakespeare Company (1962–1988).

Richard Hoggart’s The Uses of Literacy (1957) is an important book that helped start a new way of thinking about culture in the late 1950s. In this book, Hoggart studied how working-class culture was changing, especially because of mass publications like tabloid newspapers, cheap novels, and popular magazines. He described the traditional working-class lifestyle, including work, family, religion, and local entertainment, and argued that these were being damaged by modern media and entertainment, such as the jukebox. Hoggart believed this influence was mostly negative and thought that mass culture made people less able to enjoy deep or complex ideas. Although his book is sometimes criticized for being too moralistic or nostalgic, its real value lies in bringing working-class culture into academic discussions and using close reading, a method from literary studies, to look at popular culture.

In later works, such as The Way We Live Now (1995), he regretted the decline in moral authority that he held religion once provided. He also attacked contemporary education for its emphasis on the vocational, and cultural relativism for its tendency to concentrate on the popular and meretricious.

== Personal life ==
One of his two sons was the political journalist Simon Hoggart, who predeceased him by three months, and the other was the television critic Paul Hoggart. He was also survived by a daughter, Nicola. In The Chatterley Affair, a 2006 dramatisation of the 1960 trial made for the digital television channel BBC Four, he was played by actor David Tennant.

== Death ==
In later life he suffered from dementia. He died at a nursing home in London on 10 April 2014, aged 95.

== Auden: An Introductory Essay ==
Hoggart wrote a "critical study" of the "whole range of Auden's works." This "range" included "the earlier poems of the thirties, the plays, and the long poems."

== Works ==
- Auden (Chatto, 1951) ISBN 0-7011-0762-6 biography of W. H. Auden.
- The Uses of Literacy: Aspects of Working Class Life (Chatto and Windus, 1957) ISBN 0-7011-0763-4.
- Teaching Literature (Nat. Inst. of Adult Education, 1963) ISBN 0-900559-19-5.
- Higher Education and Cultural Change: A Teacher's View (Earl Grey Memorial Lecture) (Univ.Newcastle, 1966) ISBN 0-900565-62-4.
- Contemporary Cultural Studies: An Approach to the Study of Literature and Society (Univ. Birmingham, Centre for Contemp. Cult. Studies, 1969) ISBN 0-901753-03-3 paper is based on a lecture given to the annual conference of the American Association for Higher Education at Chicago on 20 March 1978.
- Speaking to Each Other: About Society v. 1 (Chatto and Windus, 1970) ISBN 0-7011-1463-0.
- Speaking to Each Other: About Literature v. 2 (Chatto and Windus, 1970) ISBN 0-7011-1514-9.
- Only Connect: On Culture and Communication (Reith Lectures) (Chatto and Windus, 1972) ISBN 0-7011-1865-2.
- After Expansion, a Time for Diversity: The Universities Into the 1990s (ACACE, 1978) ISBN 0-906436-00-1.
- An Idea and Its Servants: UNESCO from Within (Chatto and Windus, 1978) ISBN 0-7011-2371-0.
- An English Temper (Chatto and Windus, 1982) ISBN 0-7011-2581-0.
- The Future of Broadcasting by Richard Hoggart, Janet Morgan (Holmes & Meier, 1982) ISBN 0-8419-5090-3 .
- British Council and the Arts by Richard Hoggart et al. (British Council, 1986) ISBN 0-86355-048-7.
- The Worst of Times: An Oral History of the Great Depression in Britain by Nigel Gray, Richard Hoggart (Barnes & Noble Imports, 1986) ISBN 0-389-20574-5.
- An Idea of Europe (Chatto and Windus, 1987) ISBN 0-7011-3244-2.
- A Local Habitation, 1918–40 (Chatto and Windus, 1988) ISBN 0-7011-3305-8; first volume of Hoggart's "Life and Times" describing his working-class childhood in Leeds.
- Liberty and Legislation (Frank Cass Publishers, 1989) ISBN 0-7146-3308-9.
- A Sort of Clowning: Life and Times, 1940–59 (Chatto and Windus, 1990) ISBN 0-7011-3607-3
- An Imagined Life: Life and Times, 1959–91 (Chatto and Windus, 1992) ISBN 0-7011-4015-1.
- Townscape with Figures: Farnham – Portrait of an English Town (Chatto and Windus, 1994) ISBN 0-7011-6138-8.
- A Measured Life: The Times and Places of an Orphaned Intellectual (Transaction Publishers, 1994) ISBN 1-56000-135-6.
- The Way We Live Now: Dilemmas in Contemporary Culture (Chatto and Windus, 1995) ISBN 0-7011-6501-4 republished as The Tyranny of Relativism: Culture and Politics in Contemporary English Society (Transaction Publishers, 1997) ISBN 1-56000-953-5.
- First and Last Things: The Uses of Old Age (Aurum Press, 1999) ISBN 1-85410-660-0.
- Between Two Worlds: Essays, 1978–1999 (Aurum Press, 2001) ISBN 1-85410-782-8.
- Between Two Worlds: Politics, Anti-Politics, and the Unpolitical (Transaction Publishers, 2002) ISBN 0-7658-0097-7.
- Everyday Language and Everyday Life (Transaction Publishers, 2003) ISBN 0-7658-0176-0.
- Mass Media in a Mass Society: Myth and Reality (Continuum International Publishing Group – Academi, 2004) ISBN 0-8264-7285-0.
- Promises to Keep: Thoughts in Old Age (Continuum,2005) ISBN 978-0826487148.

== See also ==
- European Museum of the Year
