= Iain Michael Chambers =

British anthropologist and sociologist (born 1949)

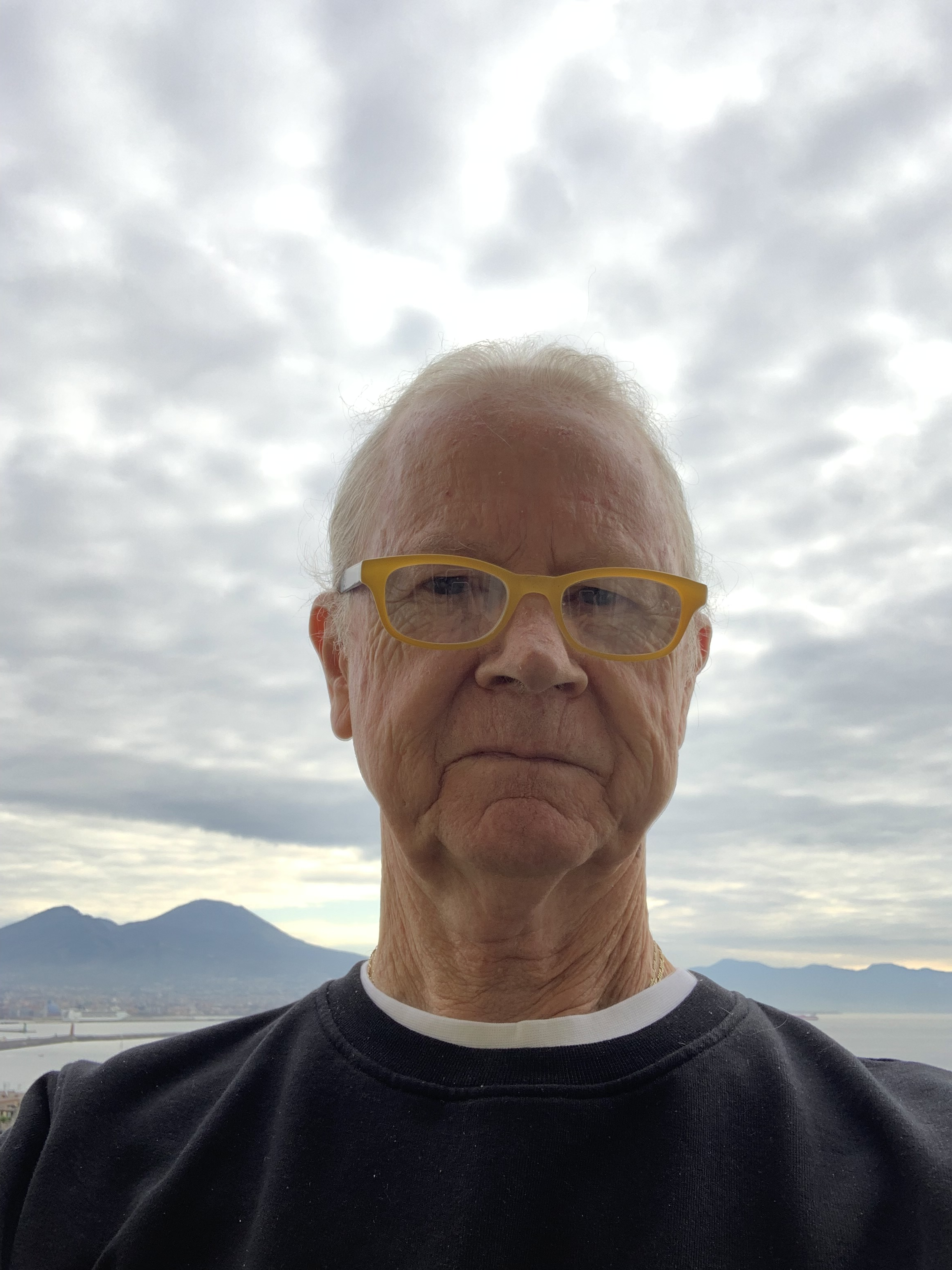

Iain Michael Chambers (born 1949) is a sociologist, historian and cultural studies scholar.

Born in Britain, he has lived in Naples since 1976. With Lidia Curti he helped to develop cultural and postcolonial studies in Italy from the University of Naples, Orientale. Subsequently, he developed a cultural and postcolonial studies approach to analysing the historical and cultural formation of the modern Mediterranean. More recently, he has extended these concerns to questions involving contemporary art. In 2022, as a member of the collective «Jimmie Durham & A Stick in the Forest by the Side of the Road», he participated in documenta 15.

He has been translated into Italian, Spanish, Turkish and German. He writes for the Italian daily il Manifesto.

== Selected publications ==
- Lampedusa/Gaza. L'orologio coloniale e i linguaggi interrotti, Orthotes, 2025.
- The Mediterranean Question (with Marta Cariello), Punctum Books, 2025.
- La questione mediterranea (with Marta Cariello), Mondadori, 2019.
- Postcolonial Interruptions, Unauthorised Modernities, Rowman & Littlefield, 2017.
- Mediterraneo blues. Musiche, malinconia postcoloniale, pensieri marittimi, Bollati Boringhieri, 2012, Tamu 2020.
- Mediterranean Crossings. The politics of an interrupted modernity, Duke University Press, 2008.
- Esercizi di potere: Gramsci, Said e il postcoloniale, Meltemi Editore, 2006.
- Culture after Humanism, Routledge 2001.
- The Postcolonial Question. Common Skies, Divided Horizons (ed. with Lidia Curti), Routledge, 1995.
- Migrancy, culture, identity, Routledge, 1993.
- Border Dialogues. Journeys in Postmodernity, Routledge 1990.
- Popular Culture. The Metropolitan Experience, Routledge, 1986.
- Urban Rhythms. Pop music and popular culture, Macmillan 1985.
