= The Uses of Literacy =

1957 book by Richard Hoggart

- Author: Richard Hoggart
- Language: English
- Genre: Non-fiction
- Publisher: Chatto and Windus
- Publication date: 1957
- Publication place: United Kingdom
- ISBN: 0701107634

The Uses of Literacy is a book written by Richard Hoggart and published in 1957, examining the influence of mass media in the United Kingdom. The book has been described as a key influence in the history of English and media studies and in the founding of cultural studies.

== Massification of culture ==
The Uses of Literacy was an attempt to understand the changes in culture in Britain caused by "massification". It has been described as marking a "watershed in public perception of culture and class and shifted academic parameters". Hoggart's argument is that "the mass publicists" were made "more insistently, effectively and in a more comprehensive and centralised form today than they were earlier" and "that we are moving towards the creation of a mass culture, that the remnants of what was at least in part an urban culture 'of the people' are being destroyed".

== The "drift" ==
In his study Hoggart looks at pulp fiction, popular magazines and newspapers and the movies and finds in all of these, "drift". He documents the break-up of the old, class culture, lamenting the loss of the close-knit communities and their replacement by the emerging manufactured mass culture. Key features of this are the tabloid newspapers, advertising, and the triumph of Hollywood. These "alien" phenomena have colonized local communities and robbed them of their distinctive features. Hoggart's attack is not on popular culture; rather it is on mass culture which is imposed from above. "Popular culture" - being self-created - has a fundamental integrity and evolves according to its own laws and dictates, not as a result of the mass media.
