= Paul Willis =

British social scientist

- Born: 1 April 1945 (age 81); Wolverhampton, England
- Education: University of Cambridge, BSc
- Known for: Learning to Labour: How Working Class Kids Get Working Class Jobs (1977)

Paul Willis (born 1945) is a British social scientist known for his work in sociology and cultural studies. Paul Willis' work is widely read in the fields of sociology, anthropology, and education, his work emphasizing consumer culture, socialisation, music, and popular culture. He was born in Wolverhampton and received his education at the University of Cambridge and at the University of Birmingham. He worked at Centre for Contemporary Cultural Studies and subsequently at the University of Wolverhampton. He was a Professor of Social/Cultural Ethnography at Keele University. In the autumn of 2010, he left Keele University and is now a professor at Princeton University.

== Background ==
Paul Willis’s work has focused mainly, but not exclusively, on the ethnographic study of lived cultural forms in a wide variety of contexts. From highly structured to weakly structured ones, Willis examines how practices of `informal cultural production` help to produce and construct cultural worlds `from below`.

Trained in literary criticism at Cambridge, Paul Willis received his PhD in 1972 from the Centre for Contemporary Cultural Studies at Birmingham University where he remained as Senior Research Fellow until 1981. He gave a paper at the 9th Symposium of the National Deviancy Conference in January 1972 entitled 'A Motor-Bike Subculture'. During the 1980s Willis served as youth policy adviser to Wolverhampton Borough Council in the English Midlands. There he produced The Youth Review (published by the Council and Ashgate) which formed the basis for youth policy and for the formation of the democratically elected Youth Council, both still functioning. During the 1990s he served first as Head of the Division of Media, Communications and Cultural Studies, and then as a member of the Professoriate at the University of Wolverhampton. In 2000 Willis co-founded the Sage journal, Ethnography. In 2003 Willis was hired as a Head Professor of social and cultural ethnography at Keele University.

Most recently, Paul Willis is a lecturer with the rank of professor in the Department of Sociology at Princeton University, giving the Clifford Geertz Commemorative Lecture at Princeton in 2011. He is also the founder and editor of the international journal Ethnography of Sage Publishing. At Princeton he teaches seminars for juniors and seniors in research methods, the sociology of work, as well as the required course for concentrators, "Claims and Evidence in Sociology." He has been published widely on work, culture, education, and method. Among his many works are Learning to Labour: How Working Class Kids Get Working Class Jobs and The Ethnographic Imagination.

== Famous works ==
Paul Willis is best known for his rich ethnographic studies of working-class youth culture. Willis is a prominent member of the celebrated Birmingham Centre for Contemporary Cultural Studies, and is the joint founding editor of the journal Ethnography. His most famous works include Learning to Labour, Profane Culture, and The Ethnographic Imagination. Willis' studies thrived on distinct fieldwork experiences with everyday people.

In 'Learning to Labour', Willis conducted an in-depth ethnography of a set of working class 'lads' in a town in the West Midlands referred to as 'Hammertown'. Published in 1975, Learning To Labour has become a standard in the field of sociology and portrays the enduring relevance of class in its cognitive and symbolic dimensions. In this book, Willis conducts a series of interviews and observations within a school, with the aim of discovering how and why 'working class kids get working class jobs'. Willis' raw interviews with 'rebel' students suggests that this counter-school culture of resistance and opposition to academia and authority has a strong resemblance to the culture one may find in the industrial workplaces, ironically the very same environment the 'rebel' lads were heading for. Willis stresses that structural conditions constrain symbolic work to rigid boundaries, more specifically the ever-shifting, unrelenting structure of 'class'. Willis states that symbolic resistance is short-lived, but still, it may be favored, as well as undermined, by structural conditions which may include public policies.

Willis states that the motive for his ethnographic recording of life was to show forms of humanistic creativity, and this is still the case today. "As a humanist, I'm attempting to make a theorized humanism which still preserves some element of creativity."

== Books and literature ==
- Learning to Labour in New Times, (ed with Nadine Dolby & Greg Dimitriadis). New York: Routledge, 2004, ISBN 0415948541
- The Ethnographic Imagination, Cambridge: Polity, 2000
- Nuevas Perspectivas Criticas en Educacion. (jointly edited with M Castells) et al. Barcelona: Paidós Educador, 1994
- Moving Culture, London: Gulbenkian Foundation, 1990
- Common Culture (with S Jones, J Canaan and G Hurd). Milton Keynes: Open University, Press 1990, reprinted 1994 & 1996
- The Youth Review (with A Bekenn, T Ellis and D Whitt) . Aldershot: Gower, 1988
- The Social Condition of Young People in Wolverhampton in 1984 (with A Bekenn, T Ellis and D Whitt). Wolverhampton: Wolverhampton Borough Council, 1985
- Learning to Labor: How Working Class Kids Get Working Class Jobs Stanley Aronowitz (Introduction), Columbia University Press, 1977, ISBN 0231053576
- Profane Culture, London: Routledge & Kegan Paul, 1978
- Marvel of Nature

== Critiques of Willis' work ==
Joan McFarland argues in the British Journal of Sociology that in many of Willis' works, such as Learning to Labor, he is only coming from a male standpoint. She states that while it is important to highlight unemployment as a major form of inequality, as many of his works portray, his male orientation has the effect of marginalizing and misrepresenting the interests of women. She also suggests that Willis' recommendations are somewhat anachronistic, and also too class orientated. McFarland states "While class should be a central analysis of unemployment, its important to stress that gender and race are also central issues when discussing this topic".

Other arguments suggest that Willis' work suffers from two essential errors: essentialism and dualism (philosophy of mind)

However, Willis interprets his own work differently. In a 2003 interview, Willis states "I see Learning to Labour — and my more recent work — as studies of forms of cultural production of meaning in everyday life. In this respect, I always feel pushed into a sociological straight-jacket when people take the outcomes of my work in terms of resistance or anomie, because my point is the general production of meanings within a context."
