= Angela McRobbie =

British academic (born 1951)

Angela McRobbie FBA
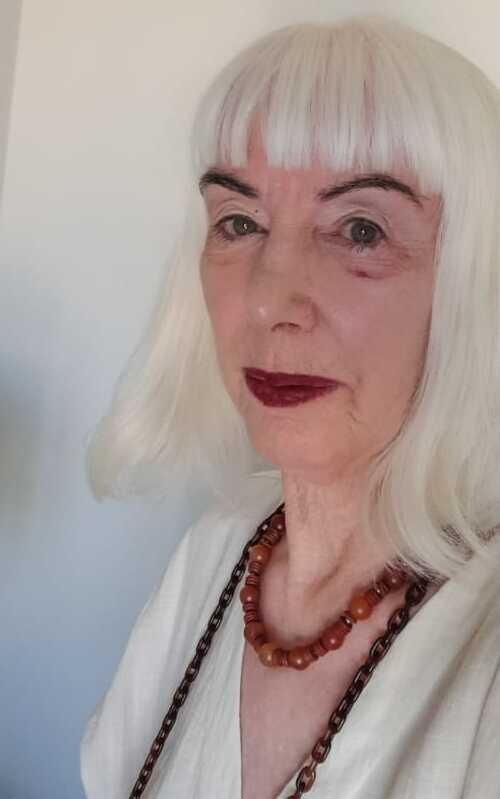
- Born: 1951 (age 74–75)
- Known for: Popular culture, contemporary media practices, and feminism

Academic background
- Education: University of Birmingham

Academic work
- Discipline: Youth culture, feminism, media studies, politics
- Institutions: Goldsmiths, University of London

Angela McRobbie FBA (born 1951) is a British sociologist and cultural theorist. Since the 1970s, she has been associated with the Birmingham Centre for Contemporary Cultural Studies and is a leading figure in British Cultural Studies and Feminist Media Studies.

She is a professor of communications at Goldsmiths College, University of London, where she continues to teach and supervise doctoral students as well as support various curricular initiatives.

McRobbie’s academic research spans five decades. Influenced by the work of Professor Stuart Hall at Birmingham, McRobbie has authored many books and scholarly articles on young women and popular culture, gender and sexuality, the British fashion industry, social and cultural theory, the changing world of work and the new creative economy, feminism and the rise of neoliberalism.

McRobbie’s most famous works span from her mid-1970s study of the magazine Jackie to The Aftermath of Feminism (2008, German edition published in 2010). This book draws on Foucault to decipher the various technologies of gender which are directed towards young woman as "subjects of capacity". This book was followed by Feminism and the Politics of Resilience in 2020 which extends the analysis of feminism and neoliberalism to include the impact of welfare reductions and poverty shaming. In 2024 she published two books, one on the German artist Ulrike Ottinger and the other titled Feminism, Young Women and Cultural Studies: the Birmingham Essays from 1975 Onwards.

McRobbie has contributed to newspapers and magazines since the late 1970s, including BBC Radio 4, Women’s Hour and Thinking Allowed, and has written for opendemocracy and the Guardian's Comment is Free.

== Early life ==
McRobbie completed her undergraduate degree at the University of Glasgow, followed by a postgraduate at the Centre for Contemporary Cultural Studies (CCCS) at the University of Birmingham.

Her thesis on Jackie magazine was published, re-printed and translated into several languages.

== Career ==
McRobbie's early academic output emerged from her time at CCCS, where she analyzed youth subcultures and the politics of feminist research. Her essay "Girls and Subcultures," co-authored with Jenny Garber and published in Resistance Through Rituals (1975), remains a seminal contribution to cultural studies. From 1981, she held academic posts at institutions including the Polytechnic of East London, St Martins School of Art, and Thames Valley University. In 1996, she was appointed Reader at Loughborough University, where she completed her PhD in 1998. That same year she joined Goldsmiths, University of London, as Professor of Communications.

In 2018, McRobbie was elected Fellow of the British Academy. She has also held visiting professorships globally and has delivered keynote lectures at numerous international institutions.

== Scholarly work ==
McRobbie’s research is organized across five interrelated pathways that collectively reflect her sustained interest in feminist sociology and contemporary cultural studies.

Her first thematic focus emerged during her time at the Centre for Contemporary Cultural Studies at Birmingham in the 1970s.

This included her semiological reading of Jackie magazine and work on youth subcultures from a feminist perspective. She developed key critiques of male-centered subcultural theory and advanced feminist readings of popular culture. These early studies were widely distributed, translated, and adopted by institutions such as the Open University. Her essays from this period were reissued by Goldsmiths Press in 2024 in a volume titled Feminism, Young Women and Cultural Studies: The Birmingham Essays from 1975 Onwards.

Her second research trajectory dealt with the rise of the creative industries and the transformation of cultural labor, with a particular emphasis on fashion and design.

From the 1990s onward, she analyzed the emergence of cultural entrepreneurship and its intersection with neoliberal economic structures. Works such as British Fashion Design (1998) and Be Creative (2016) examine how creative labor is valorized and exploited under post-Fordist conditions. Her co-authored book in 2022 and recent articles in 2025 further this inquiry, turning attention to fashion policy and labor conditions in women’s media industries.

A third stream of McRobbie’s scholarship is grounded in feminist theory, influenced by thinkers such as Judith Butler and Stuart Hall. Her writing interrogates concepts such as post-feminist masquerade, neoliberal feminism, and the psychic life of power. Books like The Aftermath of Feminism (2008) and Feminism and the Politics of Resilience (2020) are central to this line of thought. Currently, she is working on a third volume, Feminism, Culture and Society: In Times of the Great Moving Right Show, with recent excerpts appearing in the European Journal of Cultural Studies.

Her fourth thematic focus lies in her sustained engagement with feminist, queer, and post-colonial visual culture. McRobbie has written critically on artists and filmmakers such as Ulrike Ottinger, Chantal Akerman, Yinka Shonibare, and Tatjana Turanskyj. These writings investigate aesthetic strategies and cultural politics across global contexts, as seen in her 2024 monograph on Ottinger and ongoing essays on Isaac Julien and Chila Burman.

The fifth dimension of McRobbie’s scholarship includes her role as a public intellectual. From the mid-1970s, she contributed essays, reviews, and commentary on contemporary culture and politics. She has written on themes ranging from youth culture and pop music to urban precarity and cultural policy.

== Personal life ==
McRobbie lives in London and Berlin and continues to teach and conduct research at Goldsmiths, University of London. Her interdisciplinary work reflects a lifelong commitment to feminist scholarship and public engagement.

== Honours ==
- 2019 – Honorary Doctor of Philosophy, University of Glasgow, Scotland
- 2018 – Elected Fellow of the British Academy
- 2018 – Mercator Fellow, University of Oldenburg, Germany
- 2016 – Elected Fellow of the Royal Society of the Arts
- 2013 – Guest Visiting Professor in Residence, Concordia University, Montreal, Canada
- 2013 – Guest Visiting Professor in Residence, University of British Columbia (UBC), Vancouver, Canada
- 2012 – Hooker Visiting Distinguished Professor, McMaster University, Hamilton, Canada.

== Selected bibliography ==
=== Books ===
- McRobbie, Angela (1978). 'Jackie': an ideology of adolescent femininity. Birmingham: Birmingham: Centre for Contemporary Cultural Studies (CCCS Stencilled Papers), University of Birmingham. ISBN 9780704405004.
- McRobbie, Angela (1988). Zoot suits and second-hand dresses: an anthology of fashion and music. Boston: Unwin Hyman. ISBN 9780044452379.
- McRobbie, Angela (1991). Feminism and youth culture: from 'Jackie' to 'Just seventeen'. Houndmills, Basingstoke, Hampshire: Macmillan. ISBN 9780333452639.
- McRobbie, Angela (1994). Postmodernism and popular culture. London New York: Routledge. ISBN 9780415077132. Also available in Turkish, Chinese and Korean. Individual chapters are also available in other languages.
- McRobbie, Angela (1999). In the culture society: art, fashion and popular music. London New York: Routledge. ISBN 9780415137508.
- McRobbie, Angela (2000) [1991]. Feminism and youth culture (2nd ed.). Houndmills, Basingstoke, Hampshire: Macmillan Press. ISBN 9780333770320. Also available in Chinese.
- McRobbie, Angela; Grossberg, Lawrence; Gilroy, Paul (2000). Without guarantees: in honour of Stuart Hall. London: Verso. ISBN 9781859842874.
- McRobbie, Angela (2005). The uses of cultural studies a textbook. London Thousand Oaks, California: SAGE. ISBN 9781412908450. Also available in other languages including Czech and Chinese.
- McRobbie, Angela (2009). The aftermath of feminism: gender, culture and social change. Los Angeles London: SAGE. ISBN 9780761970620. Translated into German as Top girls : Feminismus und der Aufstieg des neoliberalen Geschlechterregimes. Wiesbaden: VS-Verl. 2010. ISBN 9783531162720.
- McRobbie, Angela (2014). Be creative making a living in the new culture industries. Cambridge, UK, Malden, MA: Polity Press. ISBN 9780745661940.
- McRobbie, Angela (2016). Stuart Hall, cultural studies and the rise of Black and Asian British art. About the sociologist Stuart Hall.

=== Chapters in books ===
- McRobbie, Angela; Garber, Jenny (2000) [1978], "Girls and subcultures", in McRobbie, Angela (ed.), Feminism and youth culture (2nd ed.), Houndmills, Basingstoke, Hampshire: Macmillan Press, pp. 12–25, ISBN 9780333770320 Originally appeared as: McRobbie, Angela; Garber, Jenny (2006) [1975]. "Girls and subcultures". In Hall, Stuart; Jefferson, Tony (eds.). Resistance through rituals: youth subcultures in post-war Britain (2nd ed.). New York, US Oxford, UK: Routledge. pp. 172–184. OCLC 489757261. ISBN 9781134346530.
- McRobbie, Angela (2000) [1991]. "Settling accounts with subcultures: a feminist critique". In McRobbie, Angela (ed.). Feminism and youth culture (2nd ed.). Houndmills, Basingstoke, Hampshire: Macmillan Press. pp. 26–43. ISBN 9780333770320.
- McRobbie, Angela (2000) [1991]. "The culture of working-class girls". In McRobbie, Angela (ed.). Feminism and youth culture (2nd ed.). Houndmills, Basingstoke, Hampshire: Macmillan Press. pp. 44–66. ISBN 978-0-333770320.
- McRobbie, Angela (2000) [1991]. "Jackie magazine: romantic individualism and the teenage girl". In McRobbie, Angela (ed.). Feminism and youth culture (2nd ed.). Houndmills, Basingstoke, Hampshire: Macmillan Press. pp. 67–117. ISBN 9780333770320.
- McRobbie, Angela (2000) [1991]. "The politics of feminist research: between talk, text and action". In McRobbie, Angela (ed.). Feminism and youth culture (2nd ed.). Houndmills, Basingstoke, Hampshire: Macmillan. pp. 118–136. ISBN 9780333770320.
- McRobbie, Angela; Firth, Simon (2000) [1978]. "Rock and sexuality". In McRobbie, Angela (ed.). Feminism and youth culture (2nd ed.). Houndmills, Basingstoke, Hampshire: Macmillan Press. pp. 137–158. ISBN 978-0-333770320.
- McRobbie, Angela (2000) [1991]. "Teenage mothers: a new social state?". In McRobbie, Angela (ed.). Feminism and youth culture (2nd ed.). Houndmills, Basingstoke, Hampshire: Macmillan Press. pp. 159–179. ISBN 978-0-333770320.
- McRobbie, Angela; Thornton, Sarah L. (2000) [1991]. "Rethinking 'moral panic' for multi-mediated social worlds". In McRobbie, Angela (ed.). Feminism and youth culture (2nd ed.). Houndmills, Basingstoke, Hampshire: Macmillan Press. pp. 180–197. ISBN 978-0-333770320.
- McRobbie, Angela (2000) [1991]. "Sweet smell of success? New ways of being young women". In McRobbie, Angela (ed.). Feminism and youth culture (2nd ed.). Houndmills, Basingstoke, Hampshire: Macmillan Press. pp. 198–214. ISBN 978-0-333770320.
- McRobbie, Angela (2004). "Notes on postfeminism and popular culture: Bridget Jones and the new gender regime". In Harris, Anita (ed.). All about the girl: culture, power, and identity. New York: Routledge. pp. 3–14. ISBN 978-0-415947008.
- McRobbie, Angela (2013) [1978]. "Working class girls and the culture of femininity". In Centre for Contemporary Cultural Studies, Women's Studies Group (ed.). Women take issue: aspects of women's subordination. Hoboken: Taylor and Francis. pp. 96–108. ISBN 978-1-135032067.

=== Journal articles ===
- McRobbie, Angela (June 1986). "Postmodernism and popular culture". Journal of Communication Inquiry. 10 (2). SAGE Publishing: 108–116. doi:10.1177/019685998601000209. S2CID 144880197.
- McRobbie, Angela (1993). "Shut up and dance: youth culture and changing modes of femininity". Cultural Studies. 7 (3). Taylor and Francis: 406–426. doi:10.1080/09502389300490281. S2CID 143635926.
- McRobbie, Angela; Thornton, Sarah L. (December 1995). "Rethinking 'moral panic' for multi-mediated social worlds". The British Journal of Sociology. 46 (4). The London School of Economics and Political Science: 559–574. doi:10.2307/591571. JSTOR 591571.
- McRobbie, Angela (Summer 1996). "The writing of Adam Phillips". Soundings. 3. Lawrence and Wishart.
- McRobbie, Angela (2002). "Clubs to Companies Notes on The Decline of The Political Culture in Speeded Up Creative Worlds". Cultural Studies. 16 (4). Taylor and Francis: 516–531. doi:10.1080/09502380210139098. S2CID 143773663.
- McRobbie, Angela (2004). "Feminism and the socialist tradition... undone? A response to recent work by Judith Butler". Cultural Studies. 18 (4). Taylor and Francis: 503–522. doi:10.1080/0950238042000232226. S2CID 142706918.
- McRobbie, Angela (2004). "Post-feminism and popular culture". Feminist Media Studies. 4 (3). Taylor and Francis: 255–264. doi:10.1080/1468077042000309937. S2CID 56017452.
- McRobbie, Angela (2007). "Top girls? Young women and the post-feminist sexual contract". Cultural Studies. 21 (4–5). Taylor and Francis: 718–737. doi:10.1080/09502380701279044. S2CID 143794471.
- McRobbie, Angela (2008). "Young women and consumer culture: an intervention" (PDF). Cultural Studies. 22 (5). Taylor and Francis: 531–550. doi:10.1080/09502380802245803. S2CID 5550242.
- McRobbie, Angela (2008). "Pornographic permutations". The Communication Review. 11 (3). TandF: 225–236. doi:10.1080/10714420802306676. S2CID 219644675. Pdf version.
- McRobbie, Angela (2011). "Introduction: queer adventures in cultural studies". Cultural Studies. 25 (2). Taylor and Francis: 139–146. doi:10.1080/09502386.2011.535982. S2CID 218544354.
- McRobbie, Angela (2013). "Angela McRobbie interviews herself: How did it happen, how did I get there?". Cultural Studies. 27 (5). Taylor and Francis: 828–832. doi:10.1080/09502386.2013.773677. S2CID 161169575.

== See also ==
- Goldsmiths, University of London
- Culture theory
- Politics
- Rosalind Gill
- Feminism
- Feminist philosophy
- Feminist theory
- Gender studies
- Sexualization
- Society
- Youth culture
