= Value (semiotics) =

Concept in semiotics

In semiotics, the value of a sign depends on its position and relations in the system of signification and upon the particular codes being used.

== Saussure's value ==
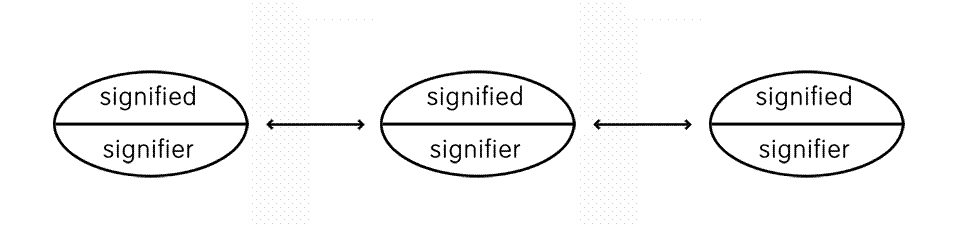
the internal, vertical relationship between signifier and signified is distinct from the horizontal relation of values between signs.

Value is the sign as it is determined by the other signs in a semiotic system. For linguist Ferdinand de Saussure, for example, the content of a sign in linguistics is ultimately determined and delimited not by its internal content, but by what surrounds it: the synonyms redouter ("to dread"), craindre ("to fear"), and avoir peur ("to be afraid") have their particular values because they exist in opposition to one another. If two of the terms disappeared, then the remaining sign would take on their roles, become vaguer, less articulate, and lose its "extra something" because it would have nothing to distinguish itself from.

For de Saussure, this suggests that thought is a chaotic nebula until linguistic structure dissects it and holds its divisions in equilibrium. This is akin to the philosophy of Sir William Hamilton, who indirectly influenced Saussure and believed that the mind could only grasp an idea through distinguishing it from something that it is not. He reasoned that the two objects would otherwise collapse together for the mind and become indistinguishable from one another.

Value determines the sign as a whole, not just meaning. Sound is also an indeterminate nebula. The arbitrary nature of the sign and the flexibility of sound means that an agreed upon contrast is required. For example, "zena" is useful because it stands in contrast to "zenb" within an agreed upon system. Without the distinction, "zena" could be used for absolutely anything, or indeed nothing, making communication an impossibility.

It is only the sign as a whole that has value. Linguistic structure simultaneously unites sound with thought and decomposes "thought-sound" into linguistic units, or signs, consisting of a signifier and a signified (sound-pattern and concept, respectively). When analysed in isolation, the sound-pattern or concept are pure differences, emerging from series of sound-patterns or concepts that they themselves are dependent upon. But in isolation, they are mere abstractions, because neither can exist without the connection between the two. It is the sign as a whole, then, that is the concrete entity of structural linguistics, which is not a pure difference, a negative term, but a pure value, a positive term that is merely in opposition or resistance to all the other signs in the system.

== Definitions ==
=== Saussure ===
Drawing from the original definition proposed by Saussure (1857–1913), a sign has two parts:

- as a signifier, i.e. it will have a form that a person can see, touch, smell, and/or hear, and
- as the signified, i.e. it will represent an idea or mental construct of a thing rather than the thing itself.

This emphasises that the sign is merely a symbol for the class of object referred to. Hence, the lexical word or noun "box" evokes a range of possibilities from cheap card to gold-encrusted container. The reader or audience may not be able to see the particular box referred to but will be aware of its likely form from the other signs accompanying the use of the particular word.

However, there is no necessary connection between the signifier and the signified. There is nothing inherently boxy about the component sounds or letters that comprise the noun "box"—the scope of onomatopoeia is limited when forming a language. All that is necessary is that the relevant group of people should decide to use that word to denote the object. Evidence that this is the correct view comes from the fact that each language can encode signifiers with whichever signified they wish to communicate. Hence, for example, the letters comprising "air" signify what humans breathe in English, and what fish breathe in Malay, i.e. water.

This makes a system of signs a very flexible mechanism for communicating meaning, but one which is conditioned by history and culture, i.e. once a sign acquires a commonly accepted meaning in each language, it cannot arbitrarily be changed by any one person, but it is able to change diachronically.

Further, Roman Jakobson (1896–1982) proposes that when a group of signs is used, there is an emotive function that reflects the speaker's attitude to the topic of his or her discourse. Language and the other coding systems are the means whereby one self-aware individual communicates with another. By selecting particular signs and placing them in a context, the addresser is making a cognitive use of the sign system to refer to his or her own social, moral, ethical, political or other values.

=== Barthes ===
Because signs may have multiple meanings, a sign can only be interpreted in its context. Saussure believed that any one sign takes its value from its position and relations with other signs within the linguistic system. Modern semiotics draws its inspiration from the work of, inter alios, Roland Barthes (1915–1980), who argued that semiotics should expand its scope and concern: "...any system of signs, whatever their substance and limits; images, gestures, musical sounds, objects, and the complex associations of all of these, which form the content of ritual, convention or public entertainment: these constitute, if not languages, at least systems of signification" (1967, 9).

In the system to be interrogated, the relations will be both weak and strong, positive and negative, qualitative and quantitative, etc. In this, a sign cannot be attributed a value outside its context (although what is signified may have connotative meaning(s) that resonate outside the context), and what is not present can be just as significant as what is present.

In a slightly different context of critique through the archaeological and genealogical methods for the study of knowledge, Michel Foucault (1926–1984) used the idea of discontinuity as a means to revalorise elements of knowledge. In this, he considered the silences and lacunae within a text to be as significant as express statements. In both systems, the specific processes of analysis examine these gaps to reveal whose interests are served by the omissions. Such analysis is particularly useful to identify which questions are left unasked.

== Methods ==
The commutation test can be used to identify which signifiers are significant. The test depends on substitution: a particular signifier is chosen, then the effect of substituting alternatives is considered to determine the extent to which the value of the sign is changed. This both illuminates the meaning of the original choice and identifies the paradigms and code to which the signifiers used belong.

Paradigmatic analysis compiles a list of the signifiers present in the text. This set comprises the paradigm. The analyst then compares and contrasts the set with absent signifiers, i.e. with other signifiers that might have been chosen. This reveals the significance of the choices made which might have been required because of technical production constraints or the limitations of the individual's own technique, or because of the tropes, generic conventions, style and rhetorical purpose of the work. The analysis of paradigmatic relations helps to define the ‘value’ of specific items in a system.
