= Syntagma (linguistics) =

Elementary constituent segment within a text

In linguistics, a syntagma is an elementary constituent segment within a text. Such a segment can be a phoneme, a word, a grammatical phrase, a sentence, or an event within a larger narrative structure, depending on the level of analysis. Syntagmatic analysis involves the study of relationships (rules of combination) among syntagmas.

At the lexical level, syntagmatic structure in a language is the combination of words according to the rules of syntax for that language. For example, English uses determiner + adjective + noun, e.g. the big house. Another language might use determiner + noun + adjective (Spanish la casa grande) and therefore have a different syntagmatic structure.

At a higher level, narrative structures feature a realistic temporal flow guided by tension and relaxation; thus, for example, events or rhetorical figures may be treated as syntagmas of epic structures.

Syntagmatic structure is often contrasted with paradigmatic structure. In semiotics, "syntagmatic analysis" is analysis of syntax or surface structure (syntagmatic structure), rather than paradigms as in paradigmatic analysis. Analysis is often achieved through commutation tests.

== See also ==
- Ferdinand de Saussure
- Lexeme
- Morphology (linguistics)
- Phonetic word

== Sources ==
- Middleton, Richard (1990/2002). Studying Popular Music. Philadelphia: Open University Press. ISBN 0-335-15275-9.
- Cubitt, Sean (1984). Cited in Middleton (2002).
