= Paradigmatic analysis =

Linguistic analysis

Paradigmatic analysis is the analysis of paradigms embedded in the text rather than of the surface structure (syntax) of the text which is termed syntagmatic analysis. Paradigmatic analysis often uses commutation tests, i.e. analysis by substituting words of the same type or class to calibrate shifts in connotation.

== Definition of terms ==
In semiotic literary criticism, a syntagm (or syntagma) is a building block of a text into which meaning is encoded by the writer and decoded by the reader, recalling past experience and placing the message in its appropriate cultural context. Individual syntagms can be arranged together to form more complex syntagms: groups of sounds (and the letters to represent them) form words, groups of words form sentences, sentences form narratives, and so on. A list of syntagms of the same type is called a paradigm. So, in English, the alphabet is the paradigm from which the syntagms of words are formed. The set of words collected together in a lexicon becomes the paradigm from which sentences etc. are formed. Hence, paradigmatic analysis is a method for exploring a syntagm by identifying its constituent paradigm, studying the individual paradigmatic elements, and then reconstructing the process by which the syntagm takes on meaning.

The importance of paradigmatic relationships and paradigmatic analysis includes contrasting and comparing each of the meanings present in each text in which similar circumstances will be chosen. This helps to define value in the text. The importance of relations of paradigmatic opposition is to help generate an order of dynamic complexity of experience in the past. People have believed in binary opposition since at least classical times: e.g. in Aristotle's physics of four elements earth, air, fire and water, the relations among these are all binary oppositions that are believed to make up the world.

== Jakobson and Ritchie ==
Roman Jakobson's model on the functions of language has two levels of description:

1. the various component elements forming language, and
2. what humans do with the language when they use it.

In the first place, every language has a vocabulary and a syntax. Its elements are words with fixed denotative meanings. Out of these one can construct, according to the rules of the syntax, composite symbols with resultant new meanings. Secondly, in a language, some words are equivalent to whole combinations of other words, so that most meanings can be expressed in several different ways. Studies of human perception show that to some extent, what people perceive depends on what they expect to perceive. L. David Ritchie proposes that communication creates relationships between what is perceived or known by one person and what is perceived or known by others; the form of the communication will be determined in part by whether there are pre-existing relationships between the communicator and the audience. The receiver and originator of a message must work from some common understanding of what sorts of patterns are used to communicate and how these patterns are related to other events. Communication has to do with community both in the sense that it relies on having something in common in the first place and in the sense that it can influence what the communicants subsequently have in common.

== Applied to music ==
In music, paradigmatic analysis was a method of musical analysis developed by Nicolas Ruwet during the 1960s but later named by others. It is "based on the concept of 'equivalence'. Ruwet argued that the most striking characteristic of musical syntax was the central role of repetition – and, by extension, of varied repetition or transformation (Ruwet 1987)" (Middleton 1990/2002, p. 183).

Paradigmatic analysis assumes that Roman Jakobson's description of the poetic system (1960, p. 358) applies to music and that in both a "projection of the principle of equivalence from the axis of selection on to the axis of combination" occurs. Thus paradigmatic analyses are able to base the assignment of units entirely on repetition so that "anything repeated (straight or varied) is defined as a unit, and this is true on all levels," from sections to phrases and individual sounds (Middleton, ibid).
