= Commutation test =

In semiotics, the commutation test is used to analyze a signifying system. The test identifies signifiers as well as their signifieds, value and significance.

== The commutation test ==
This test is a metalingual subjective system for analysing textual or other material. It has evolved from a limited method for investigating the structure of individual signs (per Roman Jakobson). Its primary uses are to:

- identify distinctive signifiers,
- define their significance, and
- divide material into paradigmatic classes and identify the codes to which the signifiers belong (Roland Barthes).

The initial assumption is that the communication to be analysed represents both a cognitive use of the sign system and a statement that refers to the values of the addresser. The purpose of the test is therefore to illuminate the addresser's intention in using the code in this particular way. It works through a process of substitution, assessing the extent to which a change in the signifier leads to a change in the signified. The first step, therefore, is to exclude one signifier from the material to be analysed. This is a test of redundancy: to identify what meaning is lost (if any) by omitting that sign. It will be relatively unusual to find that one sign is completely superfluous, but more common to find that the contribution of the one sign to the whole meaning is relatively weak. The weakness or strength of its contribution can be calibrated more exactly by placing alternate (synonymous and antonymous) signs in the context. This will enable the analyst to make a judgment on the distinctiveness of the particular signifier chosen by the author/artist and of its value to the meaning, i.e. as more or less necessary for maintaining the meaning and/or rule structure in different occurrences. By changing the collocation between two of the existing signifiers, and so changing their original relationship, the relative significance of each signifier can be considered. Further, by also placing the original sign into different contexts, it can be seen whether the sign becomes more or less distinctive.

== The process ==
The nature of the process will be determined by the form of the media to be analysed. In textual or pictorial media where individuals are the theme of the content, this might involve a substitution of words that are synonymous, or of imagery parallel in classes representing age, gender, ethnicity, religion, ability, etc. to assess the extent to which overall meaning is affected. In visual media generally, substituting different mise en scènes or backgrounds may change the significance of objects or people in the foreground. Colour selections may affect the perceived attractiveness of the scene or of individuals whose clothing is changed. The presence or absence of branded or generic goods, of stylish or outmoded clothing, etc. may help to suggest the contribution of the original signifier.

According to Daniel Chandler, the commutation test may involve any of four basic transformations which, to a greater or lesser extent, involve modification of the syntagm:

- Paradigmatic transformations
  - substitution;
  - transposition
- Syntagmatic transformations
  - addition;
  - deletion.

== An example ==
Take the phrase:

the man hit the boy.

Now substitute "boy" with "baby", "girl", "child", "pansy", "thief". Each of these alternatives affects the implication of the phrase. A "man" rather than a father or parent randomly striking a baby or girl might be considered sexist and a crime. If the boy was a thief, this would explain the man's behaviour as retaliation or revenge. If the boy is a pansy which has pejorative connotations of cowardice or homosexuality, the man may be intolerant or overly judgmental but the victim is also presented in a less sympathetic way. The use of child not differentiated by gender is a more common usage in the context of paedophilia. When the signifiers of boy and man are transposed, the relative inequality in strength is also reversed and the interpretation shifts to more playful and less threatening images. Hence, the subjective view may be that the phrase as originally conceived was the most neutral of the possible formulations given the original form.

If we now contextualise the image in a school, seminary, prison, training gym or home environment different sets of meanings emerge depending on the presence or absence of other signifiers demonstrating the relationship between the protagonists, the time the image was created (a Victorian image of corporal punishment in a school would have a different significance from a more recent image of judicial caning in Britain, Canada or Singapore), the nature of the activity (e.g. a boxing training session or a game of tennis in which the blow is struck accidentally, etc.), the presence or absence of other people, etc.. The values are therefore added or subtracted according to the presence or absence of other signifiers.

== Discussion ==
The first stage of development in semiotics related to the spoken and/or written form of language. Later, it was expanded to cover all sign systems that have an informational content. As Umberto Eco says, "A sign is everything which can be taken as significantly substituting for something else." (1976)

Semiotics studies the relationship between the form of the sign (the signifier) and the meaning expressed (the signified), and thereby attempts to reveal the process of communicating understanding. In each case, a message is to be sent by an addresser to an addressee. For this to occur, the addresser and addressee must use a common code, Hence, language evolves dynamically. The community will identify a lexical thing that needs to be referred to in their language. By common agreement, a sign (sometimes called a signal) will be selected. Of the many possible shades of meanings that it can be used to convey, one or more will be selected and encoded, i.e. the chosen meaning(s) will be denoted or associated with the sign within the broader framework of syntactic and semantic systems available within the community. When the audience is exposed to the sign, the expectation is that they will be able to decode the meaning. As Roman Jakobson adds, there will also be an emotional element or value which represents the addresser's attitude towards the thing. This will either become a connotative meaning attached directly to the sign itself, or it will be communicated by the context in which the sign is used by the addresser.

In lexicography, the fact that a neologism is used marks its acceptance into the language. This will not be a difficult process so long as each sign has a limited and immediately useful meaning. The problem arises when several possible meanings or shades of meaning become associated with the sign. This is a shift from denotational to connotational meanings. Rules of interpretation are required to resolve uncertainty. Within the community, such rules are, for the most part, experiential and applied without conscious control. Members of a community have a shared memory of language patterns and norms which, for the most part, are stable over long periods of time. Individuals are therefore able to build up a cognitive framework which identifies the possible meanings from any grouping of signs and selects one considered the most appropriate from the context. This intuitive system is continuously tested through the audience's responses. If the responses are satisfying, intuition prevails. If the responses are obviously inappropriate, the audience will consciously review the thought process and decide whether to modify the framework. Semiotics has developed a more precise methodology for this interpretive process, seeking to expose the unstated habitual practices for interpreting signifiers.
