= Modality (semiotics) =

In semiotics, a modality is a particular way in which information is to be encoded for presentation to humans, i.e. to the type of sign and to the status of reality ascribed to or claimed by a sign, text, or genre. It is more closely associated with the semiotics of Charles Peirce (1839–1914) than Ferdinand de Saussure (1857–1913) because meaning is conceived as an effect of a set of signs. In the Peircean model, a reference is made to an object when the sign (or representamen) is interpreted recursively by another sign (which becomes its interpretant), a conception of meaning that does in fact imply a classification of sign types.

== Discussion of sign-type ==
The psychology of perception suggests the existence of a common cognitive system that treats all or most sensorily conveyed meanings in the same way. If all signs must also be objects of perception, there is every reason to believe that their modality will determine at least part of their nature. Thus, the sensory modalities will be visual, auditory, tactile, olfactory, gustatory, kinesthetic, etc. A list of sign types would include: writing, symbol, index, image, map, graph, diagram, etc. Some combinations of signs can be multi-modal, i.e. different types of signs grouped together for effect. But the distinction between a medium and a modality should be clarified:

- text is a medium for presenting the modality of natural language;
- image is both a medium and a modality;
- music is a modality for the auditory media.

So, the modality refers to a certain type of information and/or the representation format in which information is stored. The medium is the means whereby this information is delivered to the senses of the interpreter. Natural language is the primary modality, having many invariant properties across the auditory media as spoken language, the visual media as written language, the tactile media as Braille, and kinetic media as sign language. When meaning is conveyed by spoken language, it is converted into sound waves broadcast by the speaker and received by another's ears. Yet this stimulus cannot be divorced from the visual evidence of the speaker's manner and gestures, and the general awareness of the physical location and its possible connotative significance. Similarly, meaning that is contained in a visual form cannot be divorced from the iconicity and implications of the form. If handwritten, is the writing neat or does it evidence emotion in its style. What type of paper is used, what colour ink, what kind of writing instrument: all such questions are relevant to an interpretation of the significance of what is represented. But images are distinguishable from natural language. For Roland Barthes (1915–80), language functions with relatively determinate meanings whereas images "say" nothing. Nevertheless, there is a rhetoric for arranging the parts that are to signify, and an emerging, if not yet generally accepted, syntax that articulates their parts and binds them into an effective whole. Rhetorician Thomas Rosteck defined rhetoric as “the use of language and other symbolic systems to make sense of our experiences, construct our personal and collective identities, produce meaning, and prompt action in the world".

== See also ==
- Denotation
- Narrative paradigm
- Modality (human–computer interaction)
- Semantics
- Syntactics
- Pragmatics
