= Code (semiotics) =

Conventions used to communicate meaning

In semiotics, a code is a (learnt, or arbitrary, or conventional) correspondence or rule between patterns. It can be an arrangement of physical matter, including the electromagnetic spectrum, that stores the potential (when activated) to convey meaning (or a pre-specified result). For instance, the pattern of vibration we call 'sound' when activated within the mind, triggers an image; say the word "cat". Also, seeing the shapes we call 'letters' forming the word makes one think of or visualize a cat. The words upon the screen were conceived in the human mind, and then translated into computer code.

A code many are familiar with is our spoken language which is assembled from or built upon phonetic sounds (patterns of vibration in the atmosphere or air). Code can also be used to refer to any physical or electromagnetic quality that human beings (or animals, or electronic devices) can perceive and then link and associate to another set of phenomena such as in a color scheme where 'red' equals 'stop' and 'green' equals 'go'.

Ferdinand de Saussure (1857–1913) emphasised that signs only acquire meaning and value when they are interpreted in relation to each other. He believed that the relationship between the signifier and the signified was arbitrary. Hence, interpreting signs requires familiarity with the sets of conventions or codes currently in use to communicate meaning.

Roman Jakobson (1896–1982) elaborated the idea that the production and interpretation of texts depends on the existence of codes or conventions for communication. Since the meaning of a sign depends on the code within which it is situated, codes provide a framework within which signs make sense (see Semiosis).

== Discussion ==
To that extent, codes represent a broad interpretative framework used by both addressers and their addressees to encode and decode the messages. Self-evidently, the most effective communications will result when both creator and interpreter use exactly the same code.

Since signs may have many levels of meaning from the denotational to the connotational, the addresser's strategy is to select and combine the signs in ways that limit the range of possible meanings likely to be generated when the message is interpreted. This will be achieved by including metalingual contextual clues, e.g. the nature of the medium, the modality of the medium, the style, e.g. academic, literary, genre fiction, etc., and references to, or invocations of, other codes, e.g. a reader may initially interpret a set of signifiers as a literal representation, but clues may indicate a transformation into a metaphorical or allegorical interpretation diachronically. Distinctions of class or memberships of groups will be determined by the social identity each individual constructs through the way the language is spoken (i.e. with an accent or as a dialect) or written (i.e. in sentences or in SMS format), the place of residence (see Americanisms), the nature of any employment undertaken, the style of dress, and nonverbal behaviour (e.g. through differentiating customs as to the extent of private space, whether and where people may touch or stare at each other, etc.).

The process of socialisation is learning to understand the prevailing codes and then deciding which to apply at any given time, i.e. acknowledging that there is sometimes an ideological quality to the coding system, determining levels of social acceptability, reflecting current attitudes and beliefs. This includes regulatory codes that are intended to control behaviour and the use of some signifying codes. The human body is a means of using presentational codes through facial expressions, gestures, and dress. So words spoken may change their connotation to unacceptable if accompanied by inappropriate nonverbal signs.

The other code forms rely upon knowledge held by, and the interests of, the addressees. Specialised denotational codes may provide a more objective and impersonal form of language for mathematical, philosophical, and scientific texts. Hence, for example, the ability to read this text depends upon a more specialised form of vocabulary and different skills to those required to read a genre text detailing the investigations of a detective or the adventures of a secret agent. There are also specialised connotational and ideological codes to reflect particular social, political, moral, and aesthetic values. Musical and iconic codes would be relevant as between a work by Arnold Schoenberg and a piece of bubblegum pop, and a painting by Rembrandt and a comic book by Frank Miller, etc. Each medium has its own specialised codes and, by making them more explicit, semiotics is attempting to explain the practices and conventions have appeared in each form and to understand how meaning is being communicated. In return, this assists addressers to improve their techniques, no matter what their functional needs, e.g. as politicians, journalists, advertisers, creative artists, etc. Indeed, awareness leads to an intentional blending of codes for effect, e.g. an advertiser may produce a more effective campaign with a slogan, images and a jingle using lexical, social gestural, and musical codes.

== Research uses ==
In communication research and media research, the way receivers act towards the message and the way it is encoded becomes relevant, and generates different reactions:

- In "radical reading" the audience rejects the meanings, values, and viewpoints built into the text by its makers.
- In "dominant reading", the audience accepts the meanings, values, and viewpoints built into the text by its makers.
- In "subordinate reading" the audience accepts, by and large, the meanings, values, and worldview built into the text by its makers

== See also ==
- Cultural code
