= Denotation (semiotics) =

In semiotics, denotation is the surface or the literal meaning, the definition most likely to appear in a dictionary.

== Discussion ==
Drawing from the original word or definition proposed by Saussure (1857–1913), a sign has two parts:

- as a signifier, i.e. it will have a form that a person can see, touch, smell, and/or hear, and
- as the signified, i.e. it will represent an idea or mental construct of a thing rather than the thing itself.

To transmit information, both the addresser and the addressee must use the same code, whether in the literal sense, e.g. Morse Code or in the form of a language. The denotative meaning of a signifier is intended to communicate the objective semantic content of the represented thing. So, in the case of a lexical word, say "book", the intention is to do no more than describe the physical object. Any other meanings or implications will be connotative meanings.

The distinction between denotation and connotation can be made in textual analysis and the existence of dictionaries is used to support the argument that the sign system begins with a simple meaning that is then glossed as new usages are developed. But this argument equally means that no sign can be separated from both its denotational and connotational meanings, and, since the addresser is always using the sign for a particular purpose in a context, no sign can be divorced from the values of the addresser. Louis Hjelmslev (1899–1965) therefore proposes that although the function of signification may be a single process, denotation is the first step, and connotation the second. Roland Barthes (1915–1980) added a third possible step in world view or Weltanschauung in which metacognitive schema such as liberty, sexuality, autonomy, etc. create a framework of reference from which more abstract meanings may be attributed to the signs, depending on the context.

Barthes and others have argued that it is more difficult to make a clear distinction when analysing images. For example, how is one to interpret a photograph? In the real world, a human observer has binocular vision, but the two-dimensional picture must be analysed to determine depth and the relative size of objects depicted by applying rules of perspective, the operation of which can be confused by focus and composition. One view might be that the picture as interpreted is evidence of what it depicts and, since the technology collects and stores data from the real world, the resulting picture is a definition of what the camera was pointed at, and so denotational. Adopting the classification of Charles Sanders Peirce, this would be considered an indexical sign, i.e. there is a direct connection between the signifier and the signified. While it is true that an unedited photograph may be an index, digital technology is eroding the viewer's confidence that the image is an objective representation of reality. Further, the photographer made conscious decisions about the composition of the image, how to light it, whether to take a close-up or long shot, etc. All of these decisions represent both the intention and the values of the photographer in wishing to preserve this image. This led John Fiske to suggest that, "denotation is what is photographed, connotation is how it is photographed". Such problems become even more difficult to resolve once the audience knows that the photograph or moving image has been edited or staged. (See also modality)
