= Connotation (semiotics) =

This word has distinct meanings in logic, philosophy, and common usage. See connotation.

In semiotics, connotation arises when the denotative relationship between a signifier and its signified is inadequate to serve the needs of the community. A second level of meanings is termed connotative. These meanings are not objective representations of the thing, but new usages produced by the language group.

== Discussion ==
Drawing from the original definition proposed by Saussure (1857–1913), a sign has two parts:

- as a signifier, i.e. it will have a form that a person can see, touch, smell, or hear, and
- as the signified, i.e. it will represent an idea or mental construct of a thing rather than the thing itself.

Connotative meanings are developed by the community and do not represent the inherent qualities of the thing or concept originally signified as the meaning. The addition of such meanings introduces complexity into the coding system. If a signifier has only a single denotational meaning, the use of the sign will always be unambiguously decoded by the audience. But connotative meanings are context-dependent, i.e. the addresser must learn how to match the meaning intended by the addresser to one of the various possible meanings held in memory.

The power of connotation is that it enables the addresser to more easily consider abstract concepts and to introduce subtlety into the discourse. For example, a digital thermometer produces a numerical value that indicates the current state of a specific operational parameter. This technology provides an indexical sign of heat (adopting the classification of Charles Sanders Peirce (1839–1914), an indexical sign by real connection between the signifier and the signified). The number is a denotative value, i.e. it speaks only for itself. The doctor, nurse or patient will relate to the number as a visual trope, in this case a metaphor, for the health of the body. Such information adds to other data forming a symptomology for the patient, a summation that takes place at a connotative cognitive level. Hence, the meanings as to health or illness are selected from the connotational framework which the interpreter has constructed through training and experience given that each possible state of well-being is represented by a cluster of symbolic attributes, one of which is the patient's temperature.

Connotation is concerned with how the sign system is used in each message. The semantic content is selected by the addresser and represents that individual's values and intentions. Limiting an analysis purely to the sign system comprised by paradigms and syntagms excludes key elements in the interpretive process. Thus, subjective tests such as the commutation test have been developed to map connotations and so decode more of the addresser's intentions. This is achieved by changing the form of the signifiers, by substituting signifiers to assess what the alternative connotations would be and by considering what signifiers are absent and why their absences might be significant. Changes of form would require substituting different fonts for the same text, or different colours or designs for the same visual content. The use of synonyms and antonyms clarifies connotational choices as between, say, pejorative and euphemistic usages. As to absences, if a modern image of a group of people employed in a major public enterprise only contains individuals of the same gender and ethnicity, the analyst would enquire into the significance of the exclusion of those of the opposite gender and a different ethnicity. The editorial decision may be supporting social values, attitudes and beliefs that are embedded into the culture—for example, that nations ought to conscript only men to serve on the front-lines of a war. Other explanations of different contexts may expose cultural myths and prejudices which are less reasonable.
