= Syntagmatic analysis =

Analysis method in semiotics

In semiotics, syntagmatic analysis is analysis of syntax or surface structure (syntagmatic structure) as opposed to paradigms (paradigmatic analysis). This is often achieved using commutation tests.

"Syntagmatic" means that one element selects the other element either to precede it or to follow it. For example, the definitive article "the" selects a noun and not a verb.

Of particular use in semiotic study, a syntagm is a chain which leads, through syntagmatic analysis, to an understanding of how a sequence of events forms a narrative. Alternatively, syntagmatic analysis can describe the spatial relationship of a visual text such as posters, photographs or a particular setting of a filmed scene.

Roland Barthes was able to use metaphor in the form of various garments in order to display how the syntagm/paradigm relationship worked together to at once create and change meaning. Expanding on this form of explanation by Barthes, both David Lodge and Susan Spiggle have further developed the metaphor, using specific wearable items. Shirt, shorts and sandals for example, are freely interchangeable along the plane of tops, bottoms and footwear, the paradigmatic plane, assuming they follow the rules of wearable items, the syntagmatic plane. While you can change the sandals for high heels, it would be breaking the rules to wear them as a top.

== Application ==
Due to the abstract nature of the signifier/signified relationship, a free-standing signifier is unable to convey knowledge or understanding by itself. After all, the only reason any word means what it means at all is due to a consensus of understanding by the wider community. Expanding on Saussure's own example of the arbitrariness of the word "tree", or any word for that matter, it can be seen that the word "tree" by itself could mean just about any upright bit of wood with branches, whether it grows leaves or provides a place to hang cups or hats. Meaning is therefore provided by an extended syntagmatic chain, which will identify for the reader of the text just what sort of tree is meant.

This understanding leads to the opportunity to consider the linguistics of texts and language in a wider variety ways. Thwaite, Davis, and Mules identify a syntagm as "the result of using a conventional rule to combine a series of elements from various paradigms". From this understanding it is possible to consider the structure of texts—film and television being an ideal example.

Looking at the mise-en-scène of a set piece, the various signs combine to give the viewer a greater understanding of what they are viewing. The syntagmatic chain is constructed in such a way that it sets the feel of the scene and is particularly apparent when considering genre. A western for example may have many of the paradigmatic signs that the viewer has grown accustomed to. That everything is where they expect to see it is following the rules of this syntagmatic chain. If the horse is riding the cowboy, it breaks these rules and becomes a very different movie.
