= Meaning (semiotics) =

Philosophical concept

In semiotics, the study of sign processes (semiosis), the meaning of a sign is its place in a sign relation, in other words, the set of roles that the sign occupies within a given sign relation.

This statement holds whether sign is taken to mean a sign type or a sign token. Defined in these global terms, the meaning of a sign is not in general analyzable with full exactness into completely localized terms, but aspects of its meaning can be given approximate analyses, and special cases of sign relations frequently admit of more local analyses.

== Distinctions ==
Two aspects of meaning that may be given approximate analyses are the connotative relation and the denotative relation. The connotative relation is the relation between signs and their interpretant signs. The denotative relation is the relation between signs and objects. An arbitrary association exists between the signified and the signifier. For example, a US salesperson doing business in Japan might interpret silence following an offer as rejection, while to Japanese negotiators silence means the offer is being considered. This difference in interpretations represents a difference in semiotics.

== Triadic relation ==
The triadic (three part) model of the sign separates the meaning of a sign into three distinct components:

1. The representamen, which is the medium, or ‘sign vehicle’, through which the sign is represented. For example, this could be written/spoken words, a photograph, or a painting.
2. The interpretant, or what is meant by the sign.
3. The object, or that to which the sign refers.

Together, these three components generate semiosis. For example, an exclamation mark can be broken down into these components. The representamen is the exclamation mark itself, the interpretant is the idea of excitement or an elevated volume of speech, and the object is the actual excitement or elevated volume of speech to which it refers. While it might appear that the latter two are the same, the subtle difference lies in the fact that the interpretant refers to the idea of something, and the object is the thing itself.

The representamen component of the sign can be further broken down into three categories, which are icon, index, and symbol. These denote the degree of abstraction from the object to which they refer. A symbol, which is the most abstract, does not resemble or bear any physical relation to the thing that it represents in any way. For example, a peace sign has no relation to peace aside from its social construction as a symbol that represents it. An icon is slightly less abstract, and resembles to some degree the thing that it represents, and bears some physical likeness to it. A good example of this would be a painted portrait. An index is the least arbitrary category of representamen, and has a definite physical tie to that which it represents. This could be something like a weather vane blowing in the wind indicating that it is windy out, or smoke, which indicates a fire.

The triadic model of the sign was proposed by Charles Peirce. In contradistinction to Ferdinand de Saussure's dyadic model, which assumed no material referent, Peirce's model assumes that in order for a sign to be meaningful, it must refer to something external and cannot be self-contained, as it is for Saussure. Thus, Peirce's model includes the addition of an 'object'. The ‘representamen’ and ‘interpretant’ components of the triadic model are comparable to Saussure's dyadic model of the sign, which breaks down into signified and signifiier.

== See also ==
- Connotation and denotation
  - Connotation
  - Denotation
  - Connotation in semiotics
  - Denotation in semiotics
- Denotational semantics
- Fully abstract
- Information theory
- Ideasthesia
- Logic of information
- Meaning in linguistics
- Pragmatic maxim
- Pragmatics
- Peirce, Charles Sanders
- Relation
- Semantics
- Semiotic information theory
- Sign relation
- Triadic relation
