= N (disambiguation) =

N is the fourteenth letter of the English alphabet.

N or n may also refer to:

== Mathematics ==
- $\mathbb{N}$ or N, the set of natural numbers
- N, the field norm
- N for nullae, a rare Roman numeral for zero
- n, the size of a statistical sample
- n or N, a symbol representing a variable number, typically an integer

== Science ==
- ATC code N Nervous system, a section of the Anatomical Therapeutic Chemical Classification System
- Haplogroup N (mtDNA), a human mitochondrial DNA haplogroup
- Haplogroup N (Y-DNA), a human Y-chromosome DNA haplogroup
- N band, an atmospheric transmission window in the mid-infrared centred on 10 micrometres
- N ray, a hypothesized form of radiation, found to be illusory
- N., abbreviation of the Latin word nervus meaning nerve, used in anatomy, e.g. N. vagus

=== Quantities and units ===
- N for Newton (unit), the SI derived unit of force
- N or $F_n$, a normal force in mechanics
- Nitrogen, symbol N, a chemical element
- N or Asn, the symbol for the common natural amino acid asparagine
- N, the Normality (chemistry) or chemical concentration of a solution
- N, the neutron number, the number of neutrons in a nuclide
- N, in Brillouin zone, the center of a face of a body-centered cubic lattice
- N, the physical quantity "rotation" in the International System of Quantities
- n, for nano-, prefix in the SI system of units denoting a factor of 10^{−9}
- n, the optical refractive index of a material
- n, the principal quantum number, the first of a set of quantum numbers of an atomic orbital
- n, an electron density, the measure of the probability of an electron being present at a specific location
- n, an amount of substance in chemical physics
- n, the coordination number of a substance
- n-, a lowercase prefix in chemistry denoting the straight-chain form of an open-chain compound in contrast to its branched isomer
- N-, an uppercase prefix in chemistry denoting that the substituent is bonded to the nitrogen, as in amines

== Transport ==
- N (New York City Subway service), a service of the New York City Subway
- N Judah, a Muni Metro line in San Francisco, California
- N (Los Angeles Railway), a line operated by the Los Angeles Railway from 1920 to 1950
- Tokyo Metro Namboku Line, a subway service operated by the Tokyo Metro, labeled
- Nagahori Tsurumi-ryokuchi Line, a subway service operated by the Osaka Metro, labeled
- Transilien Line N, a line of the Paris transport network
- , the official West Japan Railway Company service symbol for the Akō Line
- N, the Indonesian vehicle registration prefix for Malang, Probolinggo, Pasuruan, Lumajang and Batu

== Engineering ==
- N, in geotechnical engineering, the result of a standard penetration test
- N, in electrical systems, the connection to neutral
- N, an ITU prefix allocated to the United States for radio and television stations
- n (Poland), a digital TV platform
- N battery or N cell, a standard size of dry cell battery
- N connector, a threaded RF connector for joining coaxial cables

== Entertainment ==
- N. (novella), a 2008 short story by Stephen King
- Near (Death Note) (alias N), a character in the manga series Death Note
- N (video game), a 2005 computer game
- N (Pokémon), the leader and king of crime syndicate Team Plasma in the Pokémon franchise
- The N, a block on the Noggin TV channel
- N, the production code for the 1965 Doctor Who serial The Web Planet
- "N" Is for Noose, the fourteenth novel in Sue Grafton's "Alphabet mystery" series, published in 1998
- Serial Designation "N", one of the main characters from the web series Murder Drones (2021-2024)

=== Music ===
- N (singer), stage name of Cha Hak-yeon, leader of the South Korean boy band VIXX
- N, an alias of Drew Mulholland, who recorded more often as Mount Vernon Arts Lab
- N (album), a 2008 album by Norther
- "N", a song by BanYa for the "Pump It Up: The Perfect Collection" music video game
- "n", a song by iamamiwhoami

== Language ==
- n, the International Phonetic Alphabet symbol for a voiced alveolar nasal sound
  - n̪, n̼, n̥, ɳ, ɳ̊, ɲ, ɲ̊, ŋ, ŋ̊, ɴ, symbols representing other nasal consonants in the International Phonetic Alphabet
- N (kana), a Japanese kana
- Noun, a part of speech

== Other uses ==
- Hyundai N, high performance brand of Hyundai Motor Company
- N, North, one of the cardinal directions of the compass
- N postcode area, the part of the London post town covering part of North London, England
- ₦, the symbol for the Nigerian naira currency
- N, the code used to denote vehicle registration plates of Norway
- N-class ferry, a class of small RORO ferry
- N scale or N gauge, a popular model railway size
- N, the identifier for the knight (chess) in algebraic notation
- November, the military time zone code for UTC−01:00
- Nachrichten-Abteilung, naval intelligence department of Imperial German

== See also ==
- Wolfsangel, a N/Z-shaped symbol
- N class (disambiguation)
- N road (disambiguation)
- N type (disambiguation)
- N-word (disambiguation)
- n- (disambiguation) as a prefix
- Ñ, a letter used in the Spanish and Filipino alphabets
- И, a letter used in almost all Cyrillic alphabets
- η, the lower case Greek letter eta
- א, the Hebrew letter aleph
