= David Bleich (academic) =

American literary theorist and academic

- Occupations: professor, Author
- Known for: Subjective reader-response theory

David Bleich is an American literary theorist and academic. He is noted for developing the Bleich "heuristic", a reader-response approach to teaching literature. He is also a proponent of reader-response criticism to literature, advocating subjective interpretations of literary texts. He has published research on language and its use in social contexts as well as postsecondary pedagogy.

Bleich is an English professor at the University of Rochester.

== Reader response ==
The reader-response theory associated with Bleich emerged from hermeneutics or the study of how readers respond to literary and cultural texts. Bleich is one of the subjective reader-response critics who consider the reader responses as the text since there is no literary text beyond the readers' interpretations. This is in addition to the view that the text that the critic analyzes is constituted by the written responses of readers and not the literary work. According to Bleich, the meaning and objective of literature are created by the reader, whose judgments depend on the validation of the community. He believes that reading is an entirely subjective process but the differences in interpretations can be negotiated and reconciled. This theory of interpretation entails the progression from subjective response to resymbolization, then to negotiation, finally leading to validated knowledge.

Bleich's reader-response view has been compared with those of the Geneva School critics' for their similarities as well as the complementing resolutions they proposed for the totalizing effects of current literary criticisms. Bleich is considered part of the Freudian branch along with Norman Holland. However, like the Geneva School, Bleich also subscribes to an understanding of meaning as a function of the reader's subjectivity and endorses Jonathan Culler's notion of reading competence.

=== Pedagogy ===
Drawing from the principle of reader-oriented criticism, Bleich maintained that the study of language and literature should be focused on creating knowledge instead of seeking knowledge. For this purpose, he advocated the antiformalist and non-objectivist approach to literary studies. His theories were first outlined in Readings and Feelings: An Introduction to Subjective Criticism. The instructional strategies include small classes and personal interactions between learners and teachers. He cited that large classes do not engender intimacy and trust, which are considered crucial in reader-response pedagogy.

The heuristic model that Bleich developed for teaching literature proposed that readers first offer their personal perceptions of a literary work – particularly what it means to them – because the insights lead to a more effective analysis of their reasons for associations and affective responses. The ensuing close analysis of the text is expected to avoid close psychological generalizations. Its application in the group setting may involve the formulation of a "response statement" then a discussion of character's point of view. Each stage of this process allows the participants to explore the link between textual management of subject matter and the affect released in either the author or the reader.

== Controversies ==
In September 2021, Bleich was suspended after students filed bias-related incident reports against his persistent use of the n-word in class. After the incident report, Bleich's classes were canceled and subsequent lectures were taken over by another instructor. The university also placed restrictive conditions that Bleich needed to satisfy in order to resume teaching. On 15 November 2021, the Academic Freedom Alliance (AFA) wrote to the University of Rochester's Dean of the School of Arts and Sciences, Gloria Culver, to defend Bleich and called the suspension a "breach of [the University's] own stated commitment to academic freedom.

The Office of the Dean has not yet publicly replied to the letter due to confidentiality and an ongoing investigation. However, Culver reaffirmed that the University is "firmly committed to the principle of academic freedom" as well as "principal pedagogic value... of respecting the opinions and contributions of others."

In an email to the University of Rochester's Campus Times, Bleich stood by his use of the n-word and commented that "silencing teachers and honoring all discomforts of students will not contribute to the ending of racism in the United States." He also said, "I hope the University of Rochester will decide to take a productive path toward the study and understanding of how the uses of language may be a path [t]o ending violence rather than a pretext for recrimination."

== Publications ==
- Readings and Feelings: An Introduction to Subjective Criticism (1975)
- Subjective Criticism (1978)
- Utopia: The Psychology of a Cultural Fantasy (1984)
- The Double Perspective: Language, Literacy, and Social Relations (1988)
- Know and Tell: A Pedagogy of Disclosure, Genre, and Membership (1998)
- The Materiality of Reading (2006)
- The Materiality of Language: Gender, Politics, and the University (2013)
