= Interpretive communities =

Approach to literary criticism

Interpretive communities are a theoretical concept stemming from reader-response criticism and publicized by Stanley Fish although it was in use in other fields and may be found as early as 1964 in the "Historical News and Notices" of the Tennessee Historical Quarterly (p. 98) and also, and again before Fish's usage, in Richard Crouter's 1974 "H. Reinhold Neibuhr and Stoicism" in The Journal of Religious Ethics. They appeared in an article by Fish in 1976 entitled "Interpreting the Variorum". Fish's theory states that a text does not have meaning outside of a set of cultural assumptions regarding both what the characters mean and how they should be interpreted. This cultural context often includes authorial intent, though it is not limited to it. Fish claims that we as individuals interpret texts because each of us is part of an interpretive community that gives us a particular way of reading a text. Furthermore, he claims, we cannot know whether someone is a part of our interpretive community or not, because any act of communication that we could engage in to tell whether we are part of the same interpretive community would have to be interpreted. That is, because we cannot escape our interpretive community, we can never really know its limits.

The idea has been very influential in reader-response criticism, though it has also been very controversial. It is sometimes interpreted as a relativistic standpoint that downplays verbal meaning. Fish, contrary to this, is a staunch advocate of his own readings of various texts. Rather, with "interpretative communities" he means to point out that readings of a text are culturally constructed.

== Interpretive communities and climate change models ==
In a 2016 article, anthropologist Shirley J. Fiske argues for the existence of interpretive communities regarding climate change. Fiske states in the article that ”climate skeptics are the disengaged, the doubtful, and the dismissive when it comes to global warming, and they are the least concerned and least motivated to do anything about it,” and argues that climate skepticism is less a single category but instead a continuum. Fiske distinguishes between two kinds of “climate skepticism.” One kind is politically motivated and polarizing language, while the other comes from a belief system or some other cultural framework. The second kind of climate skepticism relates to the idea of interpretive communities.

Fiske uses the concept of interpretive communities to argue that there are a variety of culturally-driven mindsets about climate change. These interpretive communities are shaped by various factors, including political affiliations, regional identities, and cultural perspectives. Fiske further links this idea to the argument that the two kinds of skepticism are not the same, although there may be some overlap between the two. Through ethnographic research on farmers in Dorchester County, Maryland, Fiske determined two different cultural models regarding climate change which can be viewed as interpretive communities. The first cultural model is climate change as natural change. In this model, farmers interpreted the changes they observed, such as rising tides and summer droughts, as part of the patterns and cycles of nature. The second cultural model is climate change as environmental change (human-caused). In this model, farmers interpreted observed changes as the result of human action. Both models are shaped by cultural assumptions of the farmers regarding nature and how it works.
