= N class =

N class or Class N may refer to:

- N-class destroyer, a class of British Royal Navy ships
- NBR N class, a class of steam locomotives used by the North British Railway
- NZR N class, a class of steam locomotives used by the New Zealand Railways Department and the Wellington and Manawatu Railway
- SECR N class, a type of steam locomotive designed in 1914 for use on the South Eastern and Chatham Railway (SECR)
- South Australian Railways N class, a class of steam locomotives
- V/Line N class, a class of diesel locomotives built in Somerton, Victoria
- Victorian Railways N class, a class of steam locomotives
- WAGR N class, a class of Australian steam locomotives
- Westrail N class, a class of Australian diesel locomotives
- United States N-class submarine, a class of US Navy submarines
- N-class blimp, a class of US Navy blimps
- N-class ferry, a class of Canadian ferries
- N-class Melbourne tram
- N-class Sydney tram

== See also ==
- N (disambiguation)
