= Psychoanalytic literary criticism =

Branch of literary criticism

Psychoanalytic literary criticism is literary criticism or literary theory that in method, concept, or form, is influenced by the tradition of psychoanalysis begun by Sigmund Freud.

Psychoanalytic reading has been practiced since the early development of psychoanalysis itself, and has developed into a heterogeneous interpretive tradition. As Celine Surprenant writes, "Psychoanalytic literary criticism does not constitute a unified field. However, all variants endorse, at least to a certain degree, the idea that literature ... is fundamentally entwined with the psyche."

Psychoanalytic criticism views artists, including authors, as neurotic. However, an artist escapes many of the outward manifestations and end results of neurosis by finding in the act of creating their art a pathway back to sanity and wholeness.

== Overview ==
The object of psychoanalytic literary criticism, at its very simplest, can be the psychoanalysis of the author or of a particularly interesting character in a given work. The criticism is similar to psychoanalysis itself, closely following the analytic interpretive process discussed in Freud's The Interpretation of Dreams and other works. Critics may view the fictional characters as psychological case studies, attempting to identify such Freudian concepts as the Oedipus complex, Freudian slips, Id, ego and superego, and so on, and demonstrate how they influence the thoughts and behaviors of fictional characters.

However, more complex variations of psychoanalytic criticism are possible. The concepts of psychoanalysis can be deployed with reference to the narrative or poetic structure itself, without requiring access to the authorial psyche (an interpretation motivated by French psychoanalyst Jacques Lacan's remark that "the unconscious is structured like a language"). Or the founding texts of psychoanalysis may themselves be treated as literature and reread for the light cast by their formal qualities on their theoretical content (Freud's texts frequently resemble detective stories, or the archaeological narratives of which he was so fond).

Like all forms of literary criticism, psychoanalytic criticism can yield useful clues to the sometimes baffling symbols, actions, and settings in a literary work; however, like all forms of literary criticism, it has its limits. For one thing, some critics rely on psychocriticism as a "one size fits all" approach, when other literary scholars argue that no one approach can adequately illuminate or interpret a complex work of art. As Guerin, et al. put it in A Handbook of Critical Approaches to Literature,

The danger is that the serious student may become theory-ridden, forgetting that Freud's is not the only approach to literary criticism. To see a great work of fiction or a great poem primarily as a psychological case study is often to miss its wider significance and perhaps even the essential aesthetic experience it should provide.

== Methods ==
=== Early applications ===
Freud wrote several important essays on literature, which he used to explore the psyche of authors and characters, to explain narrative mysteries, and to develop new concepts in psychoanalysis (for instance, Delusion and Dream in Jensen's Gradiva and his influential readings of the Oedipus myth and Shakespeare's Hamlet in The Interpretation of Dreams). The criticism has been made, however, that in his and his early followers' studies 'what calls for elucidation are not the artistic and literary works themselves, but rather the psychopathology and biography of the artist, writer, or fictional characters'. Thus 'many psychoanalysts among Freud's earliest adherents did not resist the temptation to psychoanalyze poets and painters (sometimes to Freud's chagrin'). Later analysts would conclude that 'clearly one cannot psychoanalyse a writer from his text; one can only appropriate him'.

Early psychoanalytic literary criticism would often treat the text as if it were a kind of dream. This means that the text represses its real (or latent) content behind obvious (manifest) content. The process of changing from latent to manifest content is known as the dream work and involves operations of concentration and displacement. The critic analyzes the language and symbolism of a text to reverse the process of the dream work and arrive at the underlying latent thoughts. The danger is that 'such criticism tends to be reductive, explaining away the ambiguities of works of literature by reference to established psychoanalytic doctrine; and very little of this work retains much influence today'.

=== Jungians ===
Later readers, such as Carl Jung and another of Freud's disciples, Karen Horney, broke with Freud, and their work, especially Jung's, led to other rich branches of psychoanalytic criticism: Horney's to feminist approaches including womb envy, and Jung's to the study of archetypes and the collective unconscious. Jung's work in particular was influential as, combined with the work of anthropologists such as Claude Lévi-Strauss and Joseph Campbell, it led to the entire fields of mythocriticism and archetype analysis.

Northrop Frye considered that 'the literary critic finds Freud most suggestive for the theory of comedy, and Jung for the theory of romance'.

=== Form ===
Waugh writes, 'The development of psychoanalytic approaches to literature proceeds from the shift of emphasis from "content" to the fabric of artistic and literary works'. Thus for example Hayden White has explored how 'Freud's descriptions tally with nineteenth-century theories of tropes, which his work somehow reinvents'.

Especially influential here has been the work of Jacques Lacan, an avid reader of literature who used literary examples as illustrations of important concepts in his work (for instance, Lacan argued with Jacques Derrida over the interpretation of Edgar Allan Poe's "The Purloined Letter").

'Lacan's theories have encouraged a criticism which focuses not on the author but on the linguistic processes of the text'. Within this Lacanian emphasis, 'Freud's theories become a place from which to raise questions of interpretation, rhetoric, style, and figuration'.

However, Lacanian scholars have noted that Lacan himself was not interested in literary criticism per se, but in how literature might illustrate a psychoanalytic method or concept.

=== Reader response ===
According to Ousby, 'Among modern critical uses of psychoanalysis is the development of "ego psychology" in the work of Norman Holland, who concentrates on the relations between reader and text' – as with reader response criticism. Rollin writes that 'Holland's experiments in reader response theory suggest that we all read literature selectively, unconsciously projecting our own fantasies into it'.

Thus in crime fiction, for example, 'Rycroft sees the criminal as personifying the reader's unavowed hostility to the parent'.

=== Charles Mauron: psychocriticism ===
In 1963, Charles Mauron conceived a structured method to interpret literary works via psychoanalysis. The study implied four different phases:

1. The creative process is akin to dreaming awake: as such, it is a mimetic, and cathartic, representation of an innate desire that is best expressed and revealed by metaphors and symbolically.
2. Then, the juxtaposition of a writer's works leads the critic to define symbolical themes.
3. These metaphorical networks are significant of a latent inner reality.
4. They point at an obsession just as dreams can do. The last phase consists in linking the writer's literary creation to his own personal life.

On Mauron's concept, the author cannot be reduced to a ratiocinating self: his own more or less traumatic biographical past, the cultural archetypes that have suffused his soul contrast with the conscious self, The chiasmic relation between the two tales may be seen as a sane and safe acting out. A basically unconscious sexual impulse is symbolically fulfilled in a positive and socially gratifying way, a process known as Sublimation.

=== Anxiety of influence ===
'The American critic Harold Bloom has adopted the Freudian notion of the Oedipus Complex to his study of relationships of influence between poets...and his work has also inspired a feminist variant in the work of Sandra Gilbert and Susan Gubar'.

In similar vein, Shoshana Felman has asked with respect to what she calls "the guilt of poetry" the question: 'Could literary history be in any way considered as a repetitive unconscious transference of the guilt of poetry?'.

== Cultural examples ==
In Small World: An Academic Romance, one of David Lodge's satires of academia, the naive hero Persse follows Angelica to a forum where she discourses on Romance: '"Roland Barthes has taught us the close connection between narrative and sexuality, between the pleasures of the body and the 'pleasure of the text'....Romance is a multiple orgasm." Persse listened to this stream of filth flowing from between Angelica's exquisite lips and pearly teeth with growing astonishment and burning cheeks, but no one else in the audience seemed to find anything remarkable or disturbing about her presentation'.

In A.S. Byatt's novel Possession, the heroine/feminist scholar, while recognising that '"we live in the truth of what Freud discovered"', concedes that '"the whole of our scholarship – the whole of our thought – we question everything except the centrality of sexuality"'.
