= Yonge station =

Yonge station may refer to either of two subway stations in Toronto, where the Yonge branch of Line 1 meets an intersecting line:

- Bloor–Yonge station, at Bloor Street and Yonge Street
- Sheppard–Yonge station, at Sheppard Avenue and Yonge Street
