= Stacey Spiegel =

Canadian artist and new media designer

Stacey Spiegel (1955) is a Canadian artist and new media designer.

== Life ==
Spiegel was born in 1955 in Guelph, Ontario, Canada. He attended Southwood Secondary School in Galt where his talent was recognized and encouraged by the late Gerry Weber. Southwood later recognized him by electing him to their Hall of Fame in 2005. He attended York University in Toronto where he received a Bachelor of Fine Arts degree.

From 1985-1987, Spiegel was a fellow at the MIT Center for Advanced Visual Studies. From MIT he moved on to become adjunct professor at the University of Toronto from 1992-1997.

== Research ==
As a new media installation designer and artist, Spiegel worked early on with Dr. Rodney Hoinkes (Harvard Graduate School of Design) creating state-of-the-art digital installations at events such as DEAF (Dutch Electronic Arts Festival) in 1995 and 1996, Rotterdam City Festival (Safe Harbour, a harbour simulator of Marine Safety featuring a 360-degree Virtual Reality environment for experiencing the multicultural city of Rotterdam), MultiMediale, and Ars Electronica.

After years of exploring new media through art, in 1997 Spiegel and Hoinkes joined forces to start Immersion Studios (later renamed I-mmersion) to explore the potential of interactive films, theatres and classrooms. During the firm's existence from 1997–2006, I-mmersion was considered one of Canada's most innovative new media companies and a forerunner in the arena of social computing.

Immersion Studios' initial product was called an Immersion Lab, an interactive classroom design featuring computer screens at each seat and a 180-degree large-format screen. The goal of these labs was to test the potential for groups of users to co-create content for a learning system in real-time using a range of media assets - images, video, audio, text. The inaugural Immersion Lab was established at the University of California (USC) Annenberg School for Communication and Journalism in partnership with German media scholars Dr. Ute Ritterfeld and Dr. Peter Vorderer.

Immersion's subsequent products included the Immersion Cinema, a 180-degree HD digital cinema experience which has been installed in museums and science centres around the world, including Mote Marine Laboratory in Sarasota Florida, Discovery Center of Springfield Missouri, Mystic Aquarium & Institute for Exploration in Connecticut, and The Smithsonian in Washington DC.

In 2006, the company was restructured under the name Parallel World Labs which operates in both Canada and Norway (the latter under the name PWLabs AS). PWLabs has produced numerous projects in Europe since 2006, including design of the Rockheim Museum of Pop and Rock Music in Trondheim, a popular cultural attraction which also received a nomination for European Museum of the Year 2012.

== Awards and nominations ==
Spiegel has won numerous awards for his new media work, including a 2014 award for Best Product Design for Healthcare Application from the International Academy for Design & Health for his large-scale experience design at St. Olavs Hospital in Norway. Spiegel's previous awards include a 2002 Electronic Multimedia Awards (EMMA) for Technical Excellence & Innovation; a 2002 Innovation Award from the Interactive Multimedia Arts & Technologies Association; a 2002 Canadian New Media Award for New Media Visionary, a 2000 Canadian New Media Awards nomination for Company of the Year, and two Golden Reel nominations as producer/director. In the fine arts, he is a winner of the Bernice Adams Memorial Arts Award.

In 2012, Spiegel's museum experience at Rockheim was also a Nominee for European Museum of the Year.

== Academia and Publishing ==
For several years, Spiegel collaborated with the Annenberg School at the University of Southern California in a study on the effects of interactive technology on children’s understanding of science, and installed "Immersion labs” in post-secondary institutions such as Harvard University, University of Toronto, and Sheridan College.

Spiegel has also contributed to textbooks and publications, including Serious Games: Mechanisms and Effects, and the International Communication Association's 2015 publication Communication and «The Good Life».

== Art ==
Spiegel's sculptures and computer-based artworks have been exhibited in many international venues at more than 35 solo exhibitions and 14 group exhibitions, and are included in both public and private collections, and in the permanent collections of over 22 galleries and museums including the National Gallery of Canada and the Art Gallery of Ontario.

== Public artworks ==
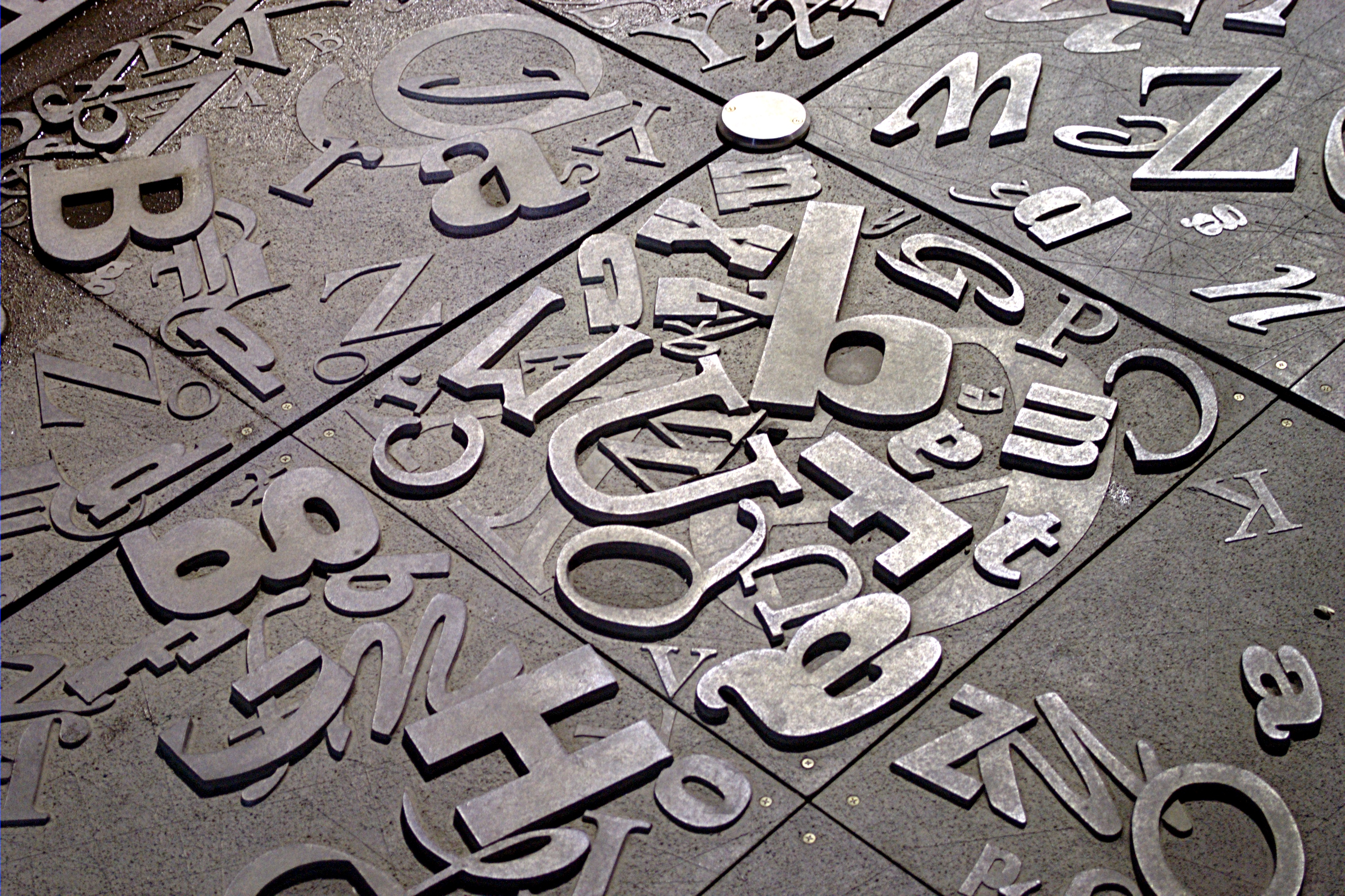
Pool of Knowledge is installed at Living Arts Park in Mississauga

Spiegel has three public art installations in the Toronto region. The city's Sheppard-Yonge subway station features "Immersion Land", a mosaic composed of 1,500,000 one-inch tiles.

Another of Spiegel's installations, Synthetic Eden, can be discovered in a hidden courtyard within the Financial District (Yonge and Adelaide Street East), a collection of three eclectic water-based sculptures and etched glass windscreens.

The City of Mississauga's Living Arts Centre also features a trio of public art works by Stacey Spiegel (1997) including a water fountain (Pool of Knowledge) and two large wall-type structures (Book Wall and Data Wall).
