= Literary theory =

Systematic study of the nature of literature

Literary theory is the systematic study of the nature of literature and of the methods for literary analysis. Since the 19th century, literary scholarship includes literary theory and considerations of intellectual history, moral philosophy, social philosophy, and interdisciplinary themes relevant to how people interpret meaning. In the humanities in modern academia, the latter style of literary scholarship is an offshoot of post-structuralism. Consequently, the word theory became an umbrella term for scholarly approaches to reading texts, some of which are informed by strands of semiotics, cultural studies, philosophy of language, and continental philosophy, often witnessed within Western canon along with some postmodernist theory.

== History ==
The practice of literary theory became a profession in the 20th century, but it has historical roots that run as far back as ancient Greece (Aristotle's Poetics is an often cited early example), ancient India (Bharata Muni's Natya Shastra), and ancient Rome (Longinus's On the Sublime). In medieval times, scholars in the Middle East (Al-Jahiz's al-Bayan wa-'l-tabyin and al-Hayawan, and ibn al-Mu'tazz's Kitab al-Badi) and Europe built rules for poetry and rhetoric. The aesthetic theories of philosophers from ancient philosophy through the 18th and 19th centuries are important influences on current literary study. The theory and criticism of literature are tied to the history of literature, with poets like Coleridge influential not merely for their poetry but also their criticism.

Some scholars refer to the 1980s-90s debates on the academic merits of theory as "the theory wars". A driving question of the theory wars was whether literary theory departments were primarily meant to train students in close reading and appreciation, or to interrogate culture and ideology through Marxism, feminism, deconstruction, and beyond.

== Overview ==
Theory begins when a culture asks what art is for. One of the fundamental questions of literary theory is "What is literature?" and "How should or do we read?". Some contemporary theorists and literary scholars believe either that "literature" cannot be defined or that it can refer to any use of language. Specific theories are distinguished not only by their methods and conclusions, but even by how they create meaning in a "text". However, some theorists acknowledge that these texts do not have a singular, fixed meaning which is deemed "correct".

Since theorists of literature often draw on very heterogeneous traditions of Continental philosophy and the philosophy of language, any classification of their approaches is only an approximation. There are many types of literary theory, which take different approaches to texts. Broad schools of theory that have historically been important include historical and biographical criticism, New Criticism, formalism, Russian formalism, and structuralism, post-structuralism, Marxism or historical materialism, feminism and French feminism, post-colonialism, new historicism, deconstruction, reader-response criticism, narratology and psychoanalytic criticism.

== Differences among schools ==
The different interpretive and epistemological perspectives of different schools of theory often arise from, and so give support to, different moral and political commitments. For instance, the work of the New Critics often contained an implicit moral dimension, and sometimes even a religious one: a New Critic might read a poem by T. S. Eliot or Gerard Manley Hopkins for its degree of honesty in expressing the torment and contradiction of a serious search for belief in the modern world. Meanwhile, a Marxist critic might find such judgments merely ideological rather than critical; the Marxist would say that the New Critical reading did not keep enough. Or a post-structuralist critic might simply avoid the issue by understanding the religious meaning of a poem as an allegory of meaning, treating the poem's references to "God" by discussing their referential nature rather than what they refer to.

Such a disagreement cannot be easily resolved, because it is inherent in the radically different terms and goals (that is, the theories) of the critics. Their theories of reading derive from vastly different intellectual traditions: the New Critic bases his work on an East-Coast American scholarly and religious tradition, while the Marxist derives his thought from a body of critical social and economic thought, the post-structuralist's work emerges from twentieth-century Continental philosophy of language.

In the late 1950s, the Canadian literary critic Northrop Frye attempted to establish an approach for reconciling historical criticism and New Criticism while addressing concerns of early reader-response and numerous psychological and social approaches. His approach, laid out in his Anatomy of Criticism, was explicitly structuralist, relying on the assumption of an intertextual "order of words" and universality of certain structural types. His approach held sway in English literature programs for several decades but lost favor during the ascendance of post-structuralism.

For some theories of literature (especially certain kinds of formalism), the distinction between "literary" and other sorts of texts is of paramount importance. Other schools (particularly post-structuralism in its various forms: new historicism, deconstruction, some strains of Marxism and feminism) have sought to break down distinctions between the two and have applied the tools of textual interpretation to a wide range of "texts", including film, non-fiction, historical writing, and even cultural events.

Mikhail Bakhtin argued that the "utter inadequacy" of literary theory is evident when it is forced to deal with the novel; while other genres are fairly stabilized, the novel is still developing.

Another crucial distinction among the various theories of literary interpretation is intentionality, the amount of weight given to the author's own opinions about and intentions for a work. For most pre-20th century approaches, the author's intentions are a guiding factor and an important determiner of the "correct" interpretation of texts. The New Criticism was the first school to disavow the role of the author in interpreting texts, preferring to focus on "the text itself" in a close reading. In fact, as much contention as there is between formalism and later schools, they share the tenet that the author's interpretation of a work is no more inherently meaningful than any other.

Artificial intelligence writing has created new opportunities for examining literature, as N. Katherine Hayles' work, Bacteria to AI points out. Hayles calls for using "literary-critical techniques" to analyze meanings from AI-derived texts, such as ChatGPT. Ethical literary criticism also employs scientific methods to study how literature is created and to examine ethical implications of AI creating literature.

== Schools ==
Listed below are some of the most commonly identified schools of literary theory, along with their major authors:

- Aestheticism – associated with Romanticism, a philosophy defining aesthetic value as the primary goal in understanding literature. This includes both literary critics who have tried to understand and/or identify aesthetic values and those like Oscar Wilde who have stressed art for art's sake.
  - Oscar Wilde, Walter Pater, Harold Bloom
- African-American literary theory
- American pragmatism and other American approaches
  - Harold Bloom, Stanley Fish, Richard Rorty
- Cognitive literary theory – applies research in cognitive science and philosophy of mind to the study of literature and culture.
  - Frederick Luis Aldama, Mary Thomas Crane, Nancy Easterlin, William Flesch, David Herman, Suzanne Keen, Patrick Colm Hogan, Alan Richardson, Ellen Spolsky, Blakey Vermeule, Lisa Zunshine
- Cambridge criticism – close examination of the literary text and the relation of literature to social issues
  - I.A. Richards, F.R. Leavis, Q.D. Leavis, William Empson.
- Critical race theory
- Cultural studies – emphasizes the role of literature in everyday life
  - Raymond Williams, Dick Hebdige, and Stuart Hall (British Cultural Studies); Max Horkheimer and Theodor Adorno; Michel de Certeau; also Paul Gilroy, John Guillory
- Darwinian literary studies – situates literature in the context of evolution and natural selection
- Deconstruction – a strategy of "close" reading that elicits the ways that key terms and concepts may be paradoxical or self-undermining, rendering their meaning undecidable
  - Jacques Derrida, Paul de Man, J. Hillis Miller, Philippe Lacoue-Labarthe, Gayatri Spivak, Avital Ronell
- Descriptive poetics
  - Brian McHale
- Feminist literary criticism
- Eco-criticism – explores cultural connections and human relationships to the natural world
- Gender (see feminist literary criticism) – which emphasizes themes of gender relations
  - Luce Irigaray, Judith Butler, Hélène Cixous, Julia Kristeva, Elaine Showalter
- Formalism – a school of literary criticism and literary theory having mainly to do with structural purposes of a particular text
- German hermeneutics and philology
  - Friedrich Schleiermacher, Wilhelm Dilthey, Hans-Georg Gadamer, Erich Auerbach, René Wellek
- Marxism (see Marxist literary criticism) – which emphasizes themes of class conflict
  - Georg Lukács, Valentin Voloshinov, Raymond Williams, Terry Eagleton, Fredric Jameson, Theodor Adorno, Walter Benjamin
- Narratology
- New Criticism – looks at literary works on the basis of what is written, and not at the goals of the author or biographical issues
  - W. K. Wimsatt, F. R. Leavis, John Crowe Ransom, Cleanth Brooks, Robert Penn Warren
- New historicism – which examines the work through its historical context and seeks to understand cultural and intellectual history through literature
  - Stephen Greenblatt, Louis Montrose, Jonathan Goldberg, H. Aram Veeser
- Postcolonialism – focuses on the influences of colonialism in literature, especially regarding the historical conflict resulting from the exploitation of less developed countries and indigenous peoples by Western nations
  - Edward Said, Gayatri Chakravorty Spivak, Homi Bhabha and Declan Kiberd
- Postmodernism – criticism of the conditions present in the twentieth century, often with concern for those viewed as social deviants or the Other
  - Michel Foucault, Roland Barthes, Gilles Deleuze, Félix Guattari and Maurice Blanchot
- Post-structuralism – a catch-all term for various theoretical approaches (such as deconstruction) that criticize or go beyond Structuralism's aspirations to create a rational science of culture by extrapolating the model of linguistics to other discursive and aesthetic formations
  - Roland Barthes, Michel Foucault, Julia Kristeva, Jacques Derrida, Gilles Deleuze
- Psychoanalysis (see psychoanalytic literary criticism) – explores the role of consciousnesses and the unconscious in literature including that of the author, reader, and characters in the text
  - Sigmund Freud, Jacques Lacan, Harold Bloom, Slavoj Žižek, Viktor Tausk
- Queer theory – examines, questions, and criticizes the role of gender identity and sexuality in literature
  - Judith Butler, Eve Kosofsky Sedgwick, Michel Foucault
- Reader-response criticism – focuses upon the active response of the reader to a text
  - Louise Rosenblatt, Wolfgang Iser, Norman Holland, Hans-Robert Jauss, Stuart Hall
- Realist
  - James Wood
- Russian formalism
  - Victor Shklovsky, Vladimir Propp
- Structuralism and semiotics (see semiotic literary criticism) – examines the universal underlying structures in a text, the linguistic units in a text and how the author conveys meaning through any structures
  - Ferdinand de Saussure, Roman Jakobson, Claude Lévi-Strauss, Roland Barthes, Mikhail Bakhtin, Juri Lotman, Umberto Eco, Jacques Ehrmann, Northrop Frye and morphology of folklore
- Other theorists: Robert Graves, Alamgir Hashmi, John Sutherland, Leslie Fiedler, Kenneth Burke, Paul Bénichou, Barbara Johnson

== See also ==
- Communication theory
- List of literary terms
- List of literary movements
- Dramatic theory
- Critical theory
- Literary criticism
- Janet C. Richards
- Text (literary theory)
- School of Resentment
