= David Bleich =

David Bleich may refer to:

- David Bleich (academic), American literary theorist
- J. David Bleich (born 1936), American professor of Jewish law and ethics
