= Reader-response criticism =

School of literary theory focused on writings' readers

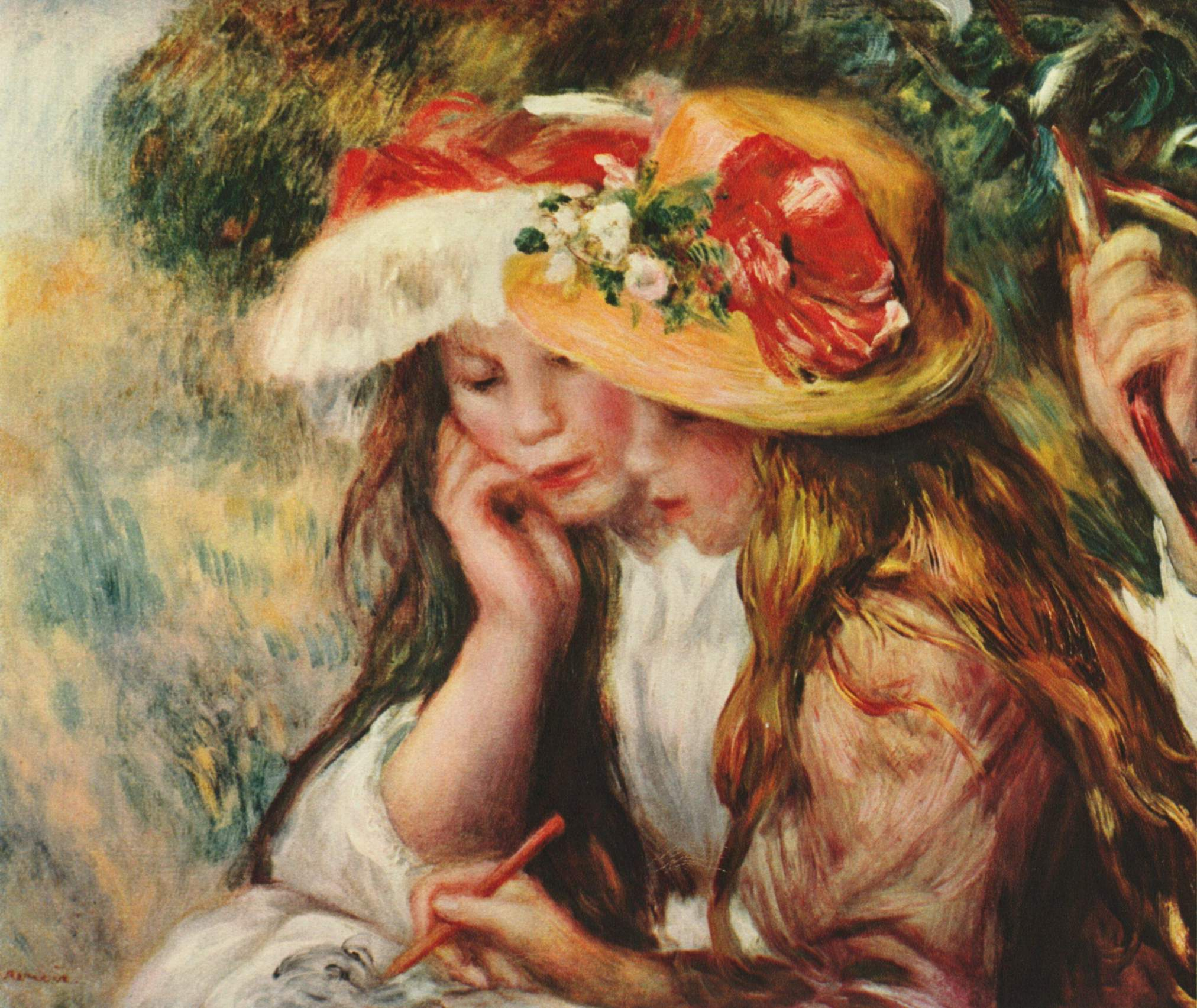
Two Girls Reading by Pierre-Auguste Renoir

Reader-response criticism is a school of literary theory that focuses on the reader (or "audience") and their experience of a literary work, in contrast to other schools and theories that focus attention primarily on the author, content, or form of the work.

== Development ==
Although literary theory has long paid some attention to the reader's role in creating the meaning and experience of a literary work, modern reader-response criticism began in the 1960s and '70s, particularly in the US and Germany. This movement shifted the focus from the text to the reader and argues that affective response is a legitimate point of departure in criticism. Its conceptualization of critical practice is distinguished from theories that favor textual autonomy (for example, Formalism and New Criticism) as well as recent critical movements (for example, structuralism, semiotics, and deconstruction) due to its focus on the reader's interpretive activities.

Classic reader-response critics include Norman Holland, Stanley Fish, Wolfgang Iser, Hans-Robert Jauss, and Roland Barthes. Important predecessors were I. A. Richards, who in 1929 analyzed a group of Cambridge undergraduates' misreadings; and Louise Rosenblatt, who, in Literature as Exploration (1938), argued that it is important for the teacher to avoid imposing any "preconceived notions about the proper way to react to any work".

Reader-response theory recognizes the reader as an active agent who imparts "real existence" to the work and completes its meaning through interpretation. Reader-response criticism argues that literature should be viewed as a performing art in which each reader creates their own, possibly unique, text-related performance. The approach avoids subjectivity or essentialism in descriptions produced through its recognition that reading is determined by textual and also cultural constraints. It stands in total opposition to the theories of formalism and the New Criticism, in which the reader's role in re-creating literary works is ignored. New Criticism had emphasized that only that which is within a text is part of the meaning of a text. No appeal to the authority or intention of the author, nor to the psychology of the reader, was allowed in the discussions of orthodox New Critics.

== Types ==
There are multiple approaches within the theoretical branch of reader-response criticism, yet all are unified in their belief that the meaning of a text is derived from the reader through the reading process. Lois Tyson classified the variations into five recognized reader-response criticism approaches whilst warning that categorizing reader-response theorists explicitly invites difficulty due to their overlapping beliefs and practices. Transactional reader-response theory, led by Louise Rosenblatt and supported by Wolfgang Iser, involves a transaction between the text's inferred meaning and the individual interpretation by the reader influenced by their personal emotions and knowledge. Affective stylistics, established by Fish, believe that a text can only come into existence as it is read; therefore, a text cannot have meaning independent of the reader. Subjective reader-response theory, associated with David Bleich, looks entirely to the reader's response for literary meaning as individual written responses to a text are then compared to other individual interpretations to find continuity of meaning. Psychological reader-response theory, employed by Norman Holland, believes that a reader's motives heavily affect how they read, and subsequently use this reading to analyze the psychological response of the reader. Social reader-response theory is Stanley Fish's extension of his earlier work, stating that any individual interpretation of a text is created in an interpretive community of minds consisting of participants who share a specific reading and interpretation strategy. In all interpretive communities, readers are predisposed to a particular form of interpretation as a consequence of strategies used at the time of reading.

An alternative way of organizing reader-response theorists is to separate them into three groups. The first involves those who focus upon the individual reader's experience ("individualists"). Reader-response critics in the United States such as Holland and Bleich are characterized as individualists due to their use of psychology as starting point, focusing on the individual identity when processing a text. Then, there are the "experimenter" group, who conduct psychological experiments on a defined set of readers and those who assume a fairly uniform response by all readers called "uniformists". The classifications show reader-response theorists who see the individual reader driving the whole experience and others who think of literary experience as largely text-driven and uniform (with individual variations that can be ignored). The former theorists, who think the reader controls, derive what is common in a literary experience from shared techniques for reading and interpreting which are, however, individually applied by different readers. The latter, who put the text in control, derive commonalities of response, obviously, from the literary work itself. The most fundamental difference among reader-response critics is probably, then, between those who regard individual differences among readers' responses as important and those who try to get around them.

=== Individualists ===
In the 1960s, David Bleich's pedagogically inspired literary theory entailed that the text is the reader's interpretation of it as it exists in their mind, and that an objective reading is not possible due to the symbolization and resymbolization process. The symbolization and resymbolization process consists of how an individual's personal emotions, needs and life experiences affect how a reader engages with a text; marginally altering the meaning. Bleich supported his theory by conducting a study with his students in which they recorded their individual meaning of a text as they experienced it, then response to their own initial written response, before comparing it with other student's responses to collectively establish literary significance according to the class's "generated" knowledge of how particular persons recreate texts. He used this knowledge to theorize about the reading process and to refocus the classroom teaching of literature.

Michael Steig and Walter Slatoff have, like Bleich, shown that students' highly personal responses can provide the basis for critical analyses in the classroom. Jeffrey Berman has encouraged students responding to texts to write anonymously and share with their classmates writings in response to literary works about sensitive subjects like drugs, suicidal thoughts, death in the family, parental abuse and the like. A kind of catharsis bordering on therapy results. In general, American reader-response critics have focused on individual readers' responses. American magazines like Reading Research Quarterly and others publish articles applying reader-response theory to the teaching of literature.

In 1961, C. S. Lewis published An Experiment in Criticism, in which he analyzed readers' role in selecting literature. He analyzed their selections in light of their goals in reading. As early as 1926, however, Lewis was already describing the reader-response principle when he maintained that "a poem unread is not a poem at all". Modern reader-response critics have drawn from his idea that one cannot see the thing itself but only the image conjured in his mind as induced by stimulated sense perceptions.

In 1967, Stanley Fish published Surprised by Sin, the first study of a large literary work (Paradise Lost) that focused on its readers' experience. In an appendix, "Literature in the Reader", Fish used "the" reader to examine responses to complex sentences sequentially, word-by-word. Since 1976, however, he has turned to real differences among real readers. He explores the reading tactics endorsed by different critical schools, by the literary professoriate, and by the legal profession, introducing the idea of "interpretive communities" that share particular modes of reading.

In 1968, Norman Holland drew on psychoanalytic psychology in The Dynamics of Literary Criticism to model the literary work. Each reader introjects a fantasy "in" the text, then modifies it by defense mechanisms into an interpretation. In 1973, however, having recorded responses from real readers, Holland found variations too great to fit this model in which responses are mostly alike but show minor individual variations.

Holland then developed a second model based on his case studies: 5 Readers Reading. An individual has (in the brain) a core identity theme (behaviors then becoming understandable as a theme and variations as in music). This core gives that individual a certain style of being—and reading. Each reader uses the physical literary work plus invariable codes (such as the shapes of letters) plus variable canons (different "interpretive communities", for example) plus an individual style of reading to build a response both like and unlike other readers' responses. Holland worked with others at the State University of New York at Buffalo, Murray Schwartz, David Willbern, and Robert Rogers, to develop a particular teaching format, the "Delphi seminar," designed to get students to "know themselves".

=== Experimenters ===
The type of reader-response critics who conduct psychological experiments on a defined set of readers are called experimenters. The experiments often involve participants free associating during the study, with the experimenters collecting and interpreting reader-responses in an informal way. Reuven Tsur in Israel has developed in great detail models for the expressivity of poetic rhythms, of metaphor, and of word-sound in poetry (including different actors' readings of a single line of Shakespeare). Richard Gerrig in the U.S. has experimented with the reader's state of mind during and after a literary experience. He has shown how readers put aside ordinary knowledge and values while they read, treating, for example, criminals as heroes. He has also investigated how readers accept, while reading, improbable or fantastic things (Coleridge's "willing suspension of disbelief"), but discard them after they have finished.

In Canada, David Miall, usually working with Donald Kuiken, has produced a large body of work exploring emotional or "affective" responses to literature, drawing on such concepts from ordinary criticism as "defamiliarization" or "foregrounding". They have used both experiments and new developments in neuropsychology, and have developed a questionnaire for measuring different aspects of a reader's response.

There are many other experimental psychologists around the world exploring readers' responses, conducting many detailed experiments. One can research their work through their professional organizations, the International Society for the Empirical Study of Literature and Media, and International Association of Empirical Aesthetics, and through such psychological indices as PSYCINFO.

Two notable researchers are Dolf Zillmann and Peter Vorderer, both working in the field of communications and media psychology. Both have theorized and tested ideas about what produces emotions such as suspense, curiosity, surprise in readers, the necessary factors involved, and the role the reader plays. Jenefer Robinson, a philosopher, has recently blended her studies on emotion with its role in literature, music, and art.

=== Uniformists ===
Wolfgang Iser exemplifies the German tendency to theorize the reader and so posit a uniform response. For him, a literary work is not an object in itself but an effect to be explained. But he asserts this response is controlled by the text. For the "real" reader, he substitutes an implied reader, who is the reader a given literary work requires. Within various polarities created by the text, this "implied" reader makes expectations, meanings, and the unstated details of characters and settings through a "wandering viewpoint". In his model, the text controls. The reader's activities are confined within limits set by the literary work.

Two of Iser's reading assumptions have influenced reading-response criticism of the New Testament. The first is the role of the reader, who is active, not passive, in the production of textual meaning. The reader fills in the "gaps" or areas of "indeterminacy" of the text. Although the "text" is written by the author, its "realization" (Konkritisation) as a "work" is fulfilled by the reader, according to Iser. Iser uses the analogy of two people gazing into the night sky to describe the role of the reader in the production of textual meaning. "Both [may] be looking at the same collection of stars, but one will see the image of a plough, and the other will make out a dipper. The 'stars' in a literary text are fixed, the lines that join them are variable." The Iserian reader contributes to the meaning of the text, but limits are placed on this reader by the text itself.

The second assumption concerns Iser's reading strategy of anticipation of what lies ahead, frustration of those expectations, retrospection, and reconceptualization of new expectations. Iser describes the reader's maneuvers in the negotiation of a text in the following way: "We look forward, we look back, we decide, we change our decisions, we form expectations, we are shocked by their nonfulfillment, we question, we muse, we accept, we reject; this is the dynamic process of recreation."

Iser's approach to reading has been adopted by several New Testament critics, including Culpepper 1983, Scott 1989, Roth 1997, Darr 1992, 1998, Fowler 1991, 2008, Howell 1990, Kurz 1993, and Powell 2001.

Another important German reader-response critic was Hans-Robert Jauss, who defined literature as a dialectic process of production and reception (Rezeption—the term common in Germany for "response"). For Jauss, readers have a certain mental set, a "horizon" of expectations (Erwartungshorizont), from which perspective each reader, at any given time in history, reads. Reader-response criticism establishes these horizons of expectation by reading literary works of the period in question.

Both Iser and Jauss, along with the Constance School, exemplify and return reader-response criticism to a study of the text by defining readers in terms of the text. In the same way, Gerald Prince posits a "narratee", Michael Riffaterre posits a "superreader", and Stanley Fish an "informed reader." And many text-oriented critics simply speak of "the" reader who typifies all readers.

== Objections ==
Reader-response critics hold that in order to understand a text, one must look to the processes readers use to create meaning and experience. Traditional text-oriented schools, such as formalism, often think of reader-response criticism as an anarchic subjectivism, allowing readers to interpret a text any way they want. Text-oriented critics claim that one can understand a text while remaining immune to one's own culture, status, personality, and so on, and hence "objectively."

To reader-response based theorists, however, reading is always both subjective and objective. Some reader-response critics (uniformists) assume a bi-active model of reading: the literary work controls part of the response and the reader controls part. Others, who see that position as internally contradictory, claim that the reader controls the whole transaction (individualists). In such a reader-active model, readers and audiences use amateur or professional procedures for reading (shared by many others) as well as their personal issues and values.

Another objection to reader-response criticism is that it fails to account for the text being able to expand the reader's understanding. While readers can and do put their own ideas and experiences into a work, they are at the same time gaining new understanding through the text. This is something that is generally overlooked in reader-response criticism.

== Extensions ==
Reader-response criticism relates to psychology, both experimental psychology for those attempting to find principles of response, and psychoanalytic psychology for those studying individual responses. Post-behaviorist psychologists of reading and of perception support the idea that it is the reader who makes meaning. Increasingly, cognitive psychology, psycholinguistics, neuroscience, and neuropsychoanalysis have given reader-response critics powerful and detailed models for the aesthetic process. In 2011 researchers found that during listening to emotionally intense parts of a story, readers respond with changes in heart rate variability, indicative of increased activation of the sympathetic nervous system. Intense parts of a story were also accompanied by increased brain activity in a network of regions known to be involved in the processing of fear, including the amygdala.

Because it rests on psychological principles, a reader-response approach readily generalizes to other arts: cinema (David Bordwell), music, or visual art (E. H. Gombrich), and even to history (Hayden White). In stressing the activity of the reader, reader-response theory may be employed to justify upsettings of traditional interpretations like deconstruction or cultural criticism.

Since reader-response critics focus on the strategies readers are taught to use, they may address the teaching of reading and literature. Also, because reader-response criticism stresses the activity of the reader, reader-response critics may share the concerns of feminist critics, and critics of gender and queer theory and postcolonialism.

== See also ==
- Hermeneutics
- Semiotic democracy
- Reception theory
- Encoding/decoding model of communication
