= Kohring =

Kohring is a surname of German origin. Notable people with the surname include:

- Matthias Kohring (born 1965), German scientist for Media and Communication studies
- Vic Kohring (1958–2022), American politician
