= Nestlé Canada Building =

Office tower in Toronto, Canada

Coordinates: 43.760649°N 79.412355°W

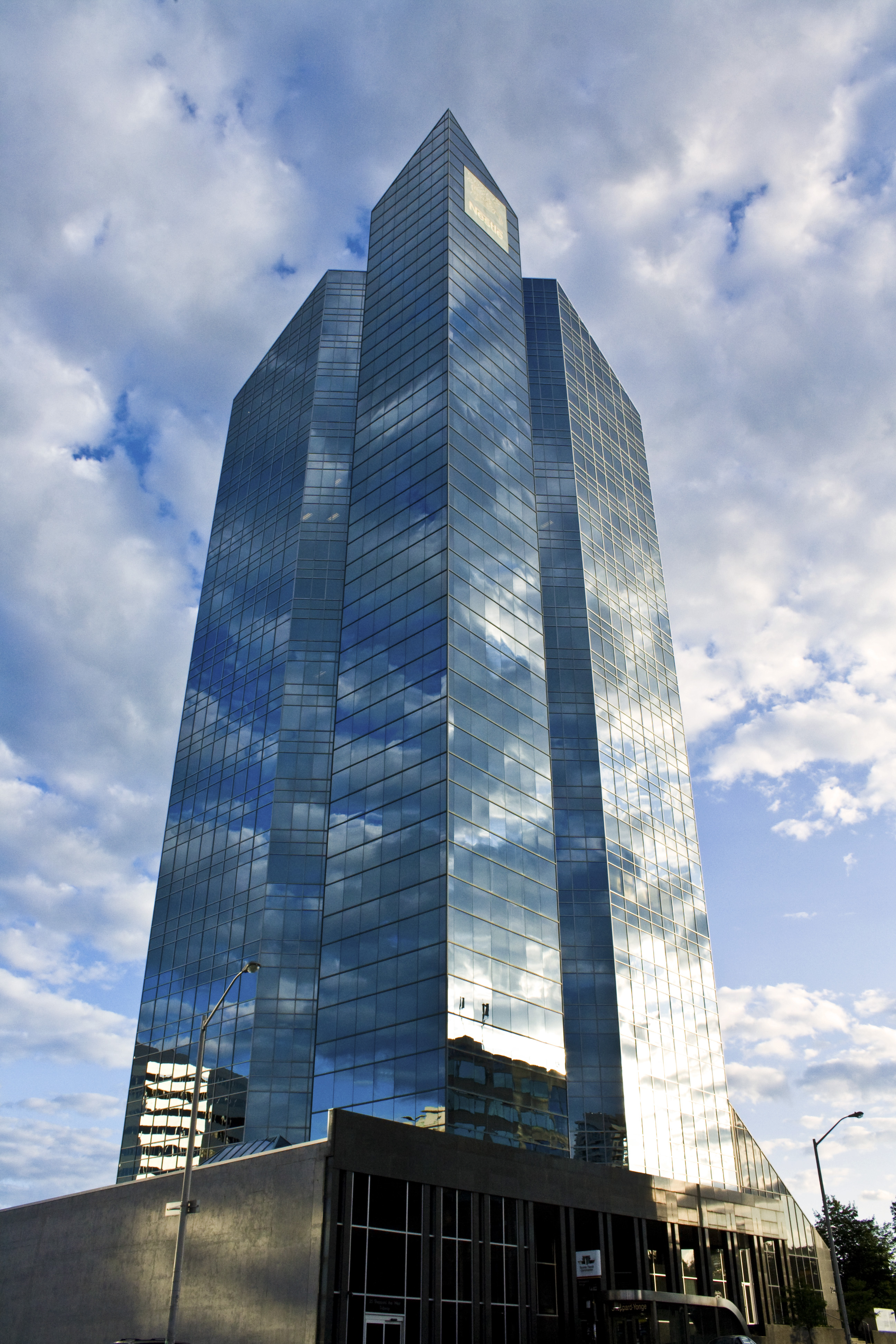
The Nestle Canada Building in North York, Ontario.

Nestlé Canada Building is a 21-floor office tower with 91,262 sq ft (8,478.5 m^{2}) of space near North York Centre in Toronto, Ontario, Canada.

Built in 1994 at the corner of Beecroft Road and Sheppard Avenue West, the building is home to Swiss-based Nestlé's Canadian corporate operations, Nestlé Canada. It has underground access to the Sheppard-Yonge (TTC) station.
