= Yonge Sheppard Centre =

Coordinates: 43.762466°N 79.410298°W

- Interactive map of the Yonge Sheppard Centre area

General information
- Type: Mixed-use development
- Architectural style: Modern
- Location: North York, Toronto, Ontario, Canada
- Construction started: 1970s
- Completed: 1976
- Renovated: 2016-2021

The Yonge Sheppard Centre is a mixed-use development located at the intersection of Yonge Street and Sheppard Avenue in the North York district of Toronto, Ontario, Canada. It is a hub for commercial, residential, and transit activities in the area.

== History ==
Originally constructed in 1976, the Yonge Sheppard Centre has undergone several renovations and expansions to accommodate the growing community's needs.

== Architecture ==
The complex features a modern architectural style with high-rise towers and multi-level retail spaces, designed to facilitate easy access to the Sheppard-Yonge subway station.

== Components ==
=== Retail ===
The centre offers a range of retail stores, from fashion and beauty to electronics and home goods.

=== Office ===
It houses multiple office towers, hosting various businesses and professional services.

=== Residential ===
The residential component includes high-rise condominiums with modern living spaces.

=== Transit ===
Directly accessible from the centre is the Sheppard-Yonge subway station, a major transit hub for the TTC.

== Recent Developments ==
A significant renovation took place from 2016 to 2021, updating retail spaces and adding new residential units.
