= Wolfgang Iser =

German literary scholar

Wolfgang Iser (22 July 1926 – 24 January 2007) was a German literary scholar.

== Biography ==
Wolfgang Iser was born in Marienberg, Germany. His parents were Paul and Else (Steinbach) Iser. He studied literature in the universities of Leipzig and Tübingen before receiving his PhD in English at Heidelberg with a dissertation on the world view of Henry Fielding (Die Weltanschauung Henry Fieldings, 1950). A year later, Iser was appointed as an instructor at Heidelberg and in 1952 as an assistant lecturer at the University of Glasgow. There, Iser began to explore contemporary philosophy and literature, which deepened his interest in inter-cultural exchange. He subsequently lectured in many other parts of the world, including Asia and Israel. He died in Constance.

He was married to Lore Iser.

== Hermeneutics ==
Iser is known for his reader-response criticism in literary theory. This theory began to evolve in 1967, while he was working in the University of Konstanz, which he helped to found in the 1960s. Together with Hans Robert Jauss, he is considered to be the founder of the Constance School of reception theory. In his approach to reader-response theory, Iser describes the process of first reading, the subsequent development of the text into a 'whole', and how the dialogue between the reader and text takes place. In his study of Shakespeare's histories, in particular Richard II, Iser interprets Richard's continually changing legal policy as expression of the desire for self-assertion. Here he follows Hans Blumenberg, and attempts to apply his theory of modernity to Shakespeare. In this theory of modernity, modernity is associated with self-assertion, which responds to the destruction of scholastic rationalism in the nominalist revolution (with William of Ockham).

For Iser, meaning is not an object to be found within a text, but is an event of construction that occurs somewhere between the text and the reader. Specifically, a reader comes to the text, which is a fixed world, but meaning is realized through the act of reading and how a reader connects the structures of the text to their own experience. To illustrate this, Iser uses the example of constellations: "The impressions that arise as a result of this process will vary from individual to individual, but only within the limits imposed by the written as opposed to the unwritten text. In the same way, two people gazing at the night sky may both be looking at the same collection of stars, but one will see the image of a plough, and the other will make out a dipper. The 'stars' in a literary text are fixed; the lines that join them are variable". A literary work, which for Iser is created when a reader and a text "converge, consists of two "poles": the artistic (the object, the text created by the author) and the aesthetic (the realization accomplished by the reader). Both of these poles contribute to the two central points of Iser's theory: the concept of "implied reader" and narrative "gaps".

When an author is composing a text, they have a particular reader in mind, which is in part represented in the text. This reader is not identical to a real, flesh-and-blood reader, but is "a textual structure anticipating the presence of a recipient without necessarily defining him…the concept of the implied reader designates a network of response-inviting structures, which impel the reader to grasp the text". Iser separates the concept of implied reader into two "interrelated aspects: the reader’s role as a textual structure, and the reader’s role as a structured act".

The textual structure refers to the reader’s point-of-view as found within the text. This standpoint is multifaceted, because the narrator, the characters, the plot, and the fictitious reader all offer sides of it. Further, the reader’s role as a textual structure is defined by the "vantage point by which he joins [these perspectives], and the meeting place they converge". All, as component parts, operate together to shape the reader’s role as found within the text.

The reader's role as a structured act refers to how a reader fulfills the textual structures by causing them to converge within their imagination. In other words, the textual structures are connected and come to life when a reader takes part in the reading process. This does not mean that the "real" reader simply accepts this role, but rather they exist in tension between their own historical reality and experience, and the acceptance of their role as reader. "The concept of the implied reader as an expression of the role offered by the text is in no way an abstraction derived from a real reader, but is rather the conditioning force behind a particular kind of tension produced by the real reader when he accepts the role". The differences between the real reader, and the role of the fictitious reader, produce a tension that allows for different connections and readings.

For Iser, a literary work is composed of both written and unwritten portions of a text. As a reader begins the reading process, the sentences that make up a work not only inform the reader of the literary movement, but produce certain expectations within the mind of the reader. However, these expectations are rarely fulfilled, as a text is "full of unexpected twists and turns, and frustrations of expectations…Thus whenever the flow is interrupted and we are led off in unexpected directions, the opportunity is given to us to bring into play our own faculty for establishing connections—for filling in the gaps left by the text itself". These gaps are the unwritten portion of the text that calls for the reader's participation. Different readers will decide to fill in the various gaps in different ways, allowing for inexhaustible realizations of the text within its provided interpretive limits. As the reader reflects on what they have read previously in the text, or if they reread the text, new light is shed on the happenings within the narrative as "certain aspects of the text will assume a significance we did not attach to them on a first reading, while others will recede into the background".

Thus, the structure of a text brings about expectations, which are interrupted by surprising unfulfillment, producing gaps, which require filling by the reader to create a coherent flow of the text. These gaps then, in turn, cause the reader to reread prior events in the text in light of those gap fillings. However, these gaps cannot be filled arbitrarily, but through interpretive limits given in the text by an author. Iser finds this experience to be the breakdown of the subject-object division, in that "text and reader no longer confront each other as object and subject, but instead the 'division' takes place within the reader himself". In the act of reading, a text becomes a living subject within the reader.

== Bibliography ==
- Die Weltanschauung Henry Fieldings (1950, unpublished dissertation)
- Die Weltanschauung Henry Fieldings (Max Niemeyer Verlag, 1952)
- Walter Pater. Die Autonomie des Ästhetischen (1960)
- Der implizite Leser. Kommunikationsformen des Romans von Bunyan bis Beckett (1972)
- Der Akt des Lesens. Theorie ästhetischer Wirkung (1976)
- Laurence Sternes "Tristram Shandy". Inszenierte Subjektivität (1987)
- Shakespeares Historien. Genesis und Geltung (1988)
- Prospecting: From Reader Response to Literary Anthropology (1989)
- Das Fiktive und das Imaginäre. Perspektiven literarischer Anthropologie (1991)
- Staging Politics: The Lasting Impact of Shakespeare's Histories (1993)
- The Range of Interpretation (2000)
- How to Do Theory (2006)
