= Cambridge criticism =

School of literary theory

Cambridge criticism is a school in literary theory that focuses on the close examination of the literary text and the link between literature and social issues. Members of this group exerted influence on English literary studies during the 1920s. It has been characterized as Puritan due to its reluctance to consider literature simply as a matter for enjoyment.

== Development ==
I. A. Richards and F.R. Leavis founded Cambridge criticism during the 1920s. Its origin is associated with the publication of Richards two books: Principles of Literary Criticism (1924) and Practical Criticism (1929). The school would later spread to Russia, where it was known as formalism. Richards, in his development of the theory, was influenced by T.S. Eliot, particularly, the latter's criticism of the Victorian poets. He maintained that, "the progress of an artist is a continual self-sacrifice, a continual extinction of personality". He then asserted that these poets suffered from a "dissociation of sensibility". This criticism worked for Richards, who aimed to professionalize literature and attempted to develop a type of cultural anti-Keynesianism and restore the credibility of literary transactions. Eliot's The Waste Land is also considered a key supporting text to the theory. This poem is said to have provided the severance between poetry and "all beliefs", showing how it developed a post-metaphysical stance. The poem demonstrated the elimination of the anachronistic need to find reassurance in escapist metaphysics by "demythologizing" itself. The nascent theory was related but distinguished from New Criticism due to its embrace of poetry's authorial and historical contexts.

Other theorists who would contribute to the development of Cambridge criticism include Charles Kay Ogden. His work covering psychology, philosophy, semantics, as well as language and its uses helped shape later iterations of the theory. One of the foundational texts of the school was The Meaning of Meaning, which he co-wrote with Richards. This outlined the theory of literary responses based on neurology. Other works that helped establish Cambridge Criticism include: His Mencius on the Mind; Basic Rules of Reason; and Basic in Teaching, East and West.

Bertrand Russell's work was also part of the evolution of the Cambridge school. This includes those that emphasized the methodological awareness about the nature of English and its teaching. In Richards and Leavis' attempt to establish a new and rigorous approach to literary analysis, they turned to Russell's redefinition of the task of philosophy, which is the logical analysis of language.

G. Wilson Knight, in his criticism of the nineteenth-century notion of character, further contributed to the refinement of Cambridge criticism. He explained that such critical method fails to capture the play as a poetic construct. He cited the case of Shakespeare's Macbeth, which he described as a construction of images and motifs that is similar to The Waste Land.

Cambridge criticism also paved the way for the emergence of American formalist criticism or New Criticism.

== Theory ==
The Cambridge school is known for its emphasis on the "literariness of literature". It has been described as a theory of reading rather than of rhetoric, writing or linguistic history. This is attributed to the view that the interpretation of meanings could only be generated through the interaction of a "master reader" with a text. In contrast to the Oxford school, Cambridge criticism emphasizes the Puritan view, which considers English literary tradition as a means of critique and critique of ideology. The ideology of Cambridge Criticism can be discerned from William Empson's work, the Seven Types of Ambiguity. This text holds that, in literature, the complex - on that is indescribable or sublime - may be understood in terms of the unifying, whole terms of the text.

It is suggested that adherents of this school favored "de-aestheticizing" literature so that it can assume its place as a key component of cultural science. The idea is for literature to become a vehicle for education in the sense of higher understanding of the humane self and of social conditions. For this reason, Cambridge criticism is considered to have a philosophical dimension. The theory was also considered as practical criticism as it sought to identify what is a "full, adequate, undistorted, and unbiased response to the words on the page." It attempts to establish reality as a modernist poem: "complex, ambiguous, interrelated but orderly and finally static in its organic relationships." Reality and the poem are both understood according to the sublime intellectual's complex sensibility or reading skills.

Cambridge criticism also came with a theory of instruction for the evaluation of poetry's authorial and historical contexts that entails practices stressing the identification of structural elements such as rhyme, meter, and stanza. In Practical Criticism, it is assumed that a poem is a communicative act and its meaning is intelligible and unproblematic. The problem emerges in the translation process, with its distortions and noise, which Richards called "stock responses" and "mnemonic irrelevance".
