= Janet C. Richards =

Janet C. Richards is a professor in the College of Education at the University of South Florida, Tampa, where she teaches courses in literacy theory and methods, writing, and qualitative research.

Richards is the Senior Editor of Literacy Practice and Research; she has worked with classroom teachers and higher education faculty in Thailand, Azerbaijan, Estonia, Pakistan and Romania. A former elementary school classroom teacher, she writes extensively on preservice and inservice teachers’ communication skills.

Richards was honored in 2016 by the International Literacy Association with an Award for Scholarly Research.

Richards' current research examines the connection between reading and writing.
