= Horizon of expectation =

Concept in literary history

"Horizon of expectation" (German: Erwartungshorizont) is a term fundamental to German academic Hans Robert Jauss's reception theory. The concept is a component of his theory of literary history where his intention is to minimise the gulf between the schools of literature and history which have previously relegated the reader to play only a minor role in the interpretation of literature. Specifically, it is the structure by which a person comprehends, decodes and appraises any text based on cultural codes and conventions particular to their time in history. These horizons are therefore historically flexible meaning readers may interpret and value a text differently from a previous generation. It emphasises the reader as an important element in the processing of texts. According to Jauss, the reader approaches a text armed with the knowledge and experience gained from interactions with other texts. These earlier texts arouse familiarity for the reader based on expectations and rules of genre and style. Jauss describes it this way, 'a literary work is not an object which stands by itself and which offers the same face to each reader in each period'. Thus reading is not an 'autonomous, free and individual' experience but rather a collection of mutual concepts fitting a period or a people.

== Horizon change ==
Jauss describes the reader as a functioning participant of the 'triangle' of text, writer and audience and that it is only the 'communication' between reader and text that will result in a shifting horizon of expectation. Interaction with a text can be emotive for the reader as their acquaintance with familiar features of genre can produce expectations for the 'middle and end' after the 'beginning' has provoked such anticipation. The horizon of expectations and rubrics invoked for a reader from previous texts will be aroused by a new text and are adjusted, transformed or merely replicated depending on the boundaries of the genre. A 'horizon change' occurs when a reader's interaction with a new text results in invalidation of a 'familiar experience' or provides a new encounter. The 'distance' between the horizon of expectation and the element or work that causes horizon change is called the 'aesthetic distance'. A text which causes no horizon change to occur fulfills all of the expectations of the reader and can be considered 'light reading'. These interactions satisfy the reader's sense of familiarity in the way of 'beauty', romanticism and the expected happy ending. If a composition challenges a reader's expectation, it can do so either with a positive result in the way of a new perception, or a negative one as in an unpleasant new experience. These expectations however may dissolve, or a negative aspect of a new text may become explicit, and thus form its own familiar expectation and become 'part of the horizon of future aesthetic experience'. Texts which are not aimed at a particular readership but which still penetrate 'the familiar horizon of expectations' so that those readers acquire them to the point that they become largely conventional, can result in other formerly celebrated texts judged as passé and thus completely disregarded. Liggins and Maunder (2004) use the example of the decline in regard toward the work of female Victorian writers by the start of the twentieth century by critics and audiences alike as a change in the expectation of both of these audiences occurred.

== History of reception ==
Jauss asserts that for any narrative to be suitably analysed, the horizons of expectations of the earliest 'audience' needs to be recreated. This process is based on the way in which the past text was produced and then embraced by its audience. By discovering the 'questions' which the text answered allows the analyst to determine how the readers perceived and comprehended the work at the time. When an author of a past work is unknown and his purpose therefore difficult to identify, the most appropriate function to understand how the work is to be comprehended is to consider the text in comparison to the backdrop of other texts of which the modern reader may hold implied as well as overt knowledge. This 'history of reception' works to determine the intertextuality and 'historical expectation of readers' as variances in readings and emphasises Jauss's primary concern of making the 'new and challenging' become 'familiar and effortless'.

== See also ==
- Fusion of horizons
