= N type =

N-type, N type or Type N may refer to:

- N-type semiconductor is a key material in the manufacture of transistors and integrated circuits
- An N-type connector is a threaded RF connector used to join coaxial cables
- The MG N-type Magnette was produced by the MG Car company from October 1934 to 1936
- The N-type calcium channel is a type of voltage-dependent calcium channel
- A Type (model theory) with n free variables
- The Dennis N-Type vehicle chassis was used to build fire engines and trucks
- The REP Type N was a military reconnaissance aircraft produced in France in 1914
- N type battery, see: N battery
- Type N power plugs and sockets, unsuccessfully proposed for Europe, but used in South Africa and South America
- New South Wales N type carriage stock, a railway carriage type in Australia
- VicRail N type carriage, a railway carriage type in Australia
