= Mannheim School of Humanities =

School of the University of Mannheim

- Type: Public
- Established: 1963
- Dean: Matthias Kohring
- Academic staff: 26 professors
- Location: Mannheim, Baden-Württemberg, Germany
- Website: www.phil.uni-mannheim.de

The Mannheim School of Humanities (MSH) is among the oldest of the five schools comprising the University of Mannheim, located in Mannheim, Baden-Württemberg, Germany. The School of Humanities, established in 1963, encompasses the fields of English studies, Germanic studies, history, media and communication studies, philosophy and Romance studies. These disciplines rank Mannheim in the top three to ten institutions in Germany.

The Mannheim School of Humanities engages in research and teaching at the intersection of culture, society and business with an interdisciplinary, international and intercultural perspective. With 26 full professorships, two junior professorships, about 100 research and teaching associates and more than 2,800 students in total, the Mannheim School of Humanities is the university's second largest school. Each year, about 1,000 new students take up their studies at the School of Humanities. The School comprises the departments of English studies, Germanic studies, history, media and communication studies, philosophy, Slavic studies and Romance studies. In close cooperation with the Business School, the School of Humanities offers several renowned interdisciplinary study programs such as "Culture and Business". Distinguished fields of research are globalization studies and linguistic topics such as multilingualism. The school stands in close cooperation with the Institute for the German Language (IDS), the MAZEM – Mannheim Center for Empirical Multilingual Research and maintains extensive cooperation with a large variety of international partner universities.

== See also ==
- University of Mannheim
- Mannheim Business School
- Education in Germany
- List of universities in Germany
