= Peter Vorderer =

German media scholar

Peter Anton Vorderer
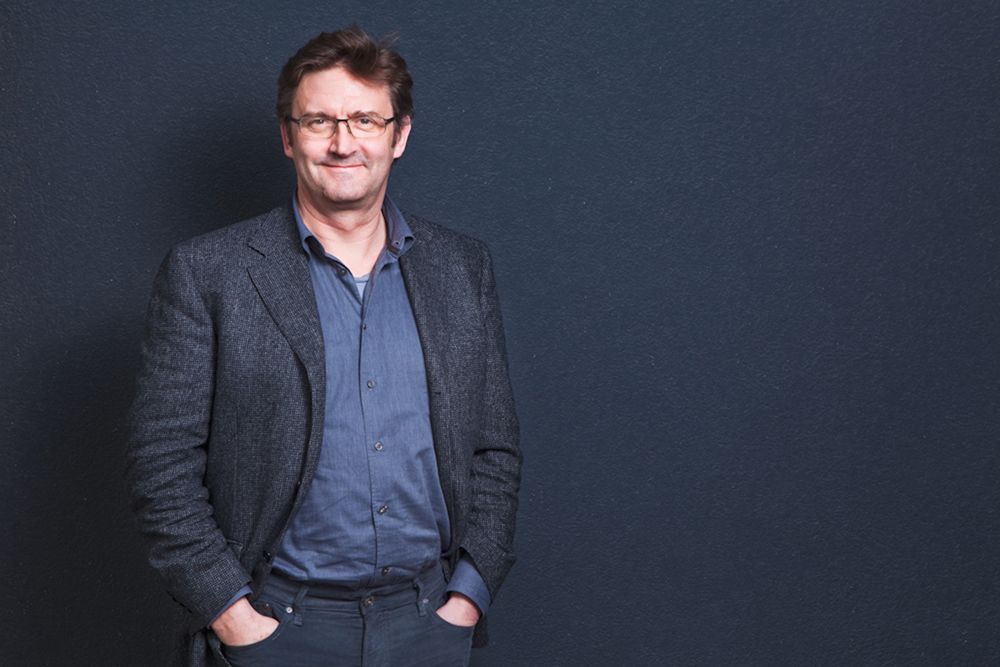
- (University of Mannheim, 2012)
- Born: Mannheim, Baden-Württemberg, Germany
- Education: Heidelberg University, University of Mannheim, University of Toronto, Technische Universität Berlin, Vrije Universiteit Amsterdam, University of Southern California
- Known for: Media Psychology; Media Effects Research; Entertainment Theory and Research; Social Change

Peter Vorderer (born 1959 in Mannheim) is a German professor of media and Communication studies at the University of Mannheim focusing on the area of media psychology, entertainment research, and the social change related to the use of new media. He made major contributions to the field of mass communication, primarily in the area of media effects research. From May 2014 until May 2015, he was president of the International Communication Association (ICA).

== Biography ==
Peter Anton Vorderer was born in Mannheim in 1959. He began his studies of psychology at the University of Heidelberg in 1980, where he finished his degree in 1987. In 1983, he spent a year as a visiting PhD student of social psychology at New York University and the University of Michigan in Ann Arbor. He also earned a degree in sociology at the University of Mannheim in 1989.

During his time in Heidelberg, Vorderer was a close colleague to the psychologist and literary scholar Norbert Groeben, where they took a stand for the development of empirical literary studies and where Vorderer participated in the development of an analytical technique (the "Heidelberger Struktur-Lege-Technik"). He continued working in this field when he was a Research associate at the Institute of Communication, Music and Media Studies at Technische Universität Berlin from 1988 to 1993, which is where he achieved his PhD in 1992.

After his time in Berlin, he spent a year working as a visiting professor of Psychology at the University of Toronto. From 1994 to 2002, Vorderer assumed the professorship for Media studies at the Institute of Journalism and Communication Research at the Hanover University of Music, Drama and Media. Afterwards, he lectured as a professor of Communication at the Annenberg School for Communication and as a professor for Psychology at the College of Letters, Arts and Sciences within the University of Southern California in Los Angeles until 2007. During the time in California, Vorderer established his reputation as the world's leading scholar of Entertainment Research (within the field of Media Effects), collaborating with scholars like Dolf Zillmann, Jennings Bryant and others.

He was professor of communication science and chair of Department of Communication Science at the Free University of Amsterdam from 2007 until 2010 as well as scientific director of the "Center for Advanced Media Research Amsterdam" (CAMeRA). He then assumed the professorship of Media and communication studies at the Mannheim School of Humanities in 2010, which is where he is still currently teaching, doing research and publishing.

Vorderer was awarded "Yangtze River Scholar" by the Shanghai Jiao Tong University in China in 2015 for outstanding achievements in the research of new media and technological development. He was furthermore elected president of the International Communication Association (ICA) in early 2014.

Vorderer is father of two daughters.

== Selected publications ==
- Zillmann, D. & Vorderer, P. (Eds.). (2000). Media entertainment: The psychology of its appeal. Mahwah, NJ: Lawrence Erlbaum Associates. ISBN 0-8058-3324-2 .
- Bryant, J. & Vorderer, P. (Eds.). (2006). Psychology of entertainment. Mahwah, NJ: Lawrence Erlbaum Associates. ISBN 0-8058-5237-9.
- Vorderer, P. & Kohring, M. (2013). Permanently Online: A Challenge for Media and Communication Research. International Journal of Communication, 7, Feature, 188–196.
- Vorderer, P. & Reinecke, L. (2015). From Mood to Meaning: The changing model of the user in entertainment research. Communication Theory, 25(4), 447–453. http://dx.doi.org/10.1111/comt.12082
