= Sheppard–Yonge station =

Toronto subway station

Sheppard–Yonge
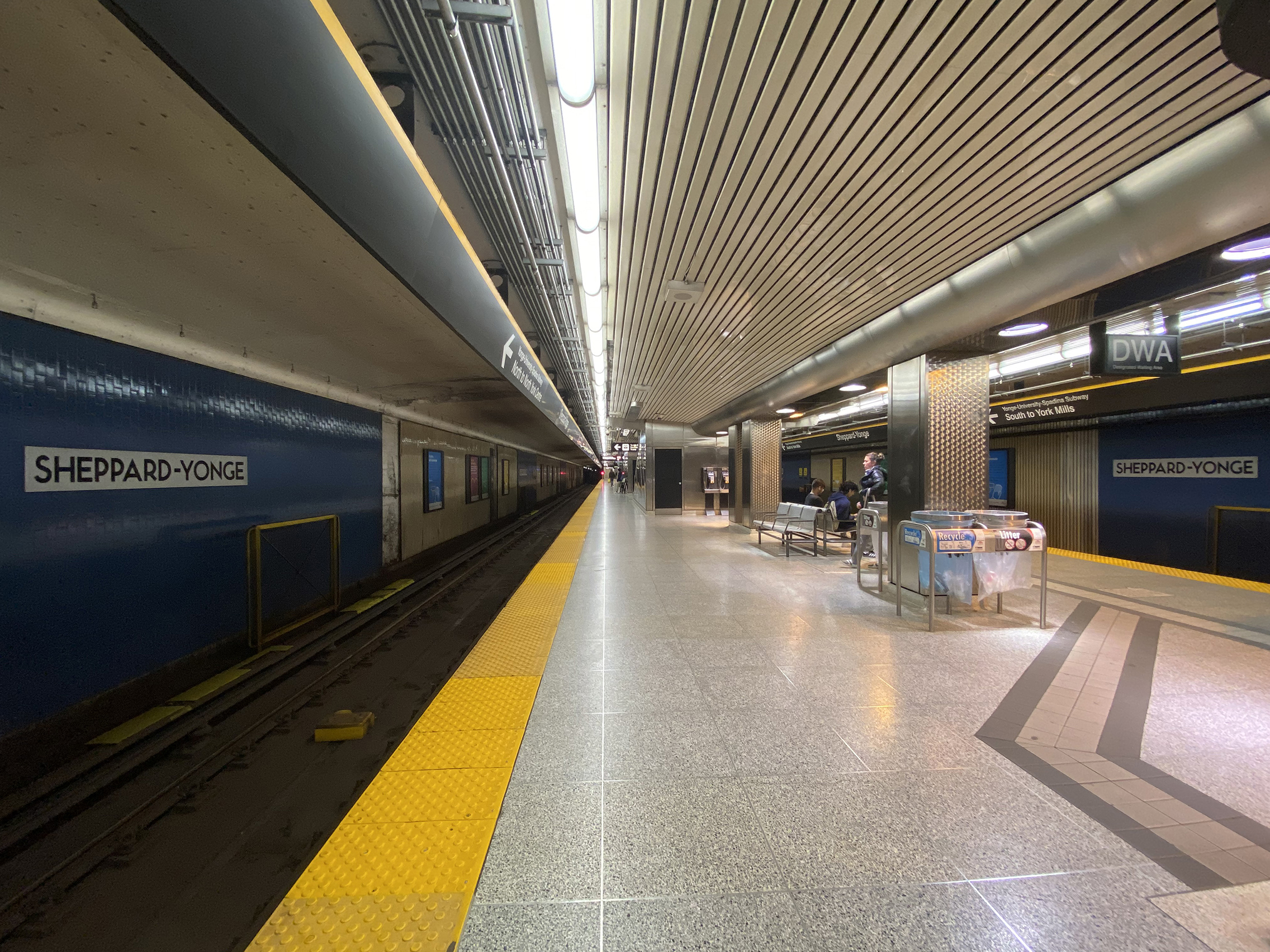
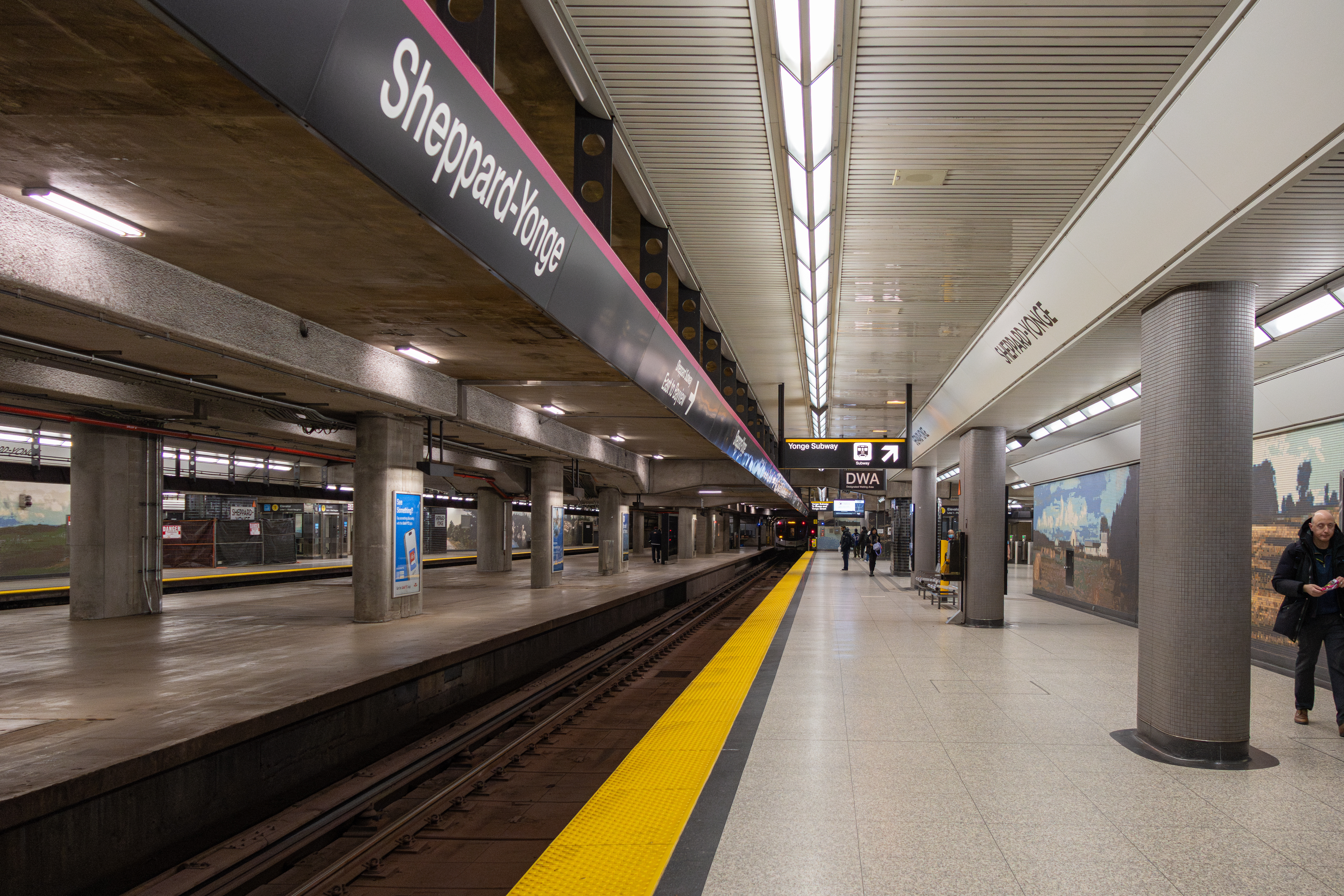
- Line 1 platform Line 4 platform

General information
- Location: 20 Sheppard Avenue West; Toronto, Ontario; Canada
- Coordinates: 43°45′41″N 79°24′39″W
- Platforms: Centre platform (Line 1); Side platforms (Line 4); Centre platform (Line 4; unused)
- Tracks: 4 (2 on each level)
- Connections: TTC buses: 84 Sheppard West; 97 Yonge; 98 Willowdale–Senlac; 185 Sheppard Central; 320 Yonge; 384 Sheppard West; 385 Sheppard East; 984 Sheppard West Express; GO Buses (on-street): 19/C Mississauga–North York; 27 Milton–North York; 32 Brampton Trinity Common–North York; 67 Keswick–North York; 96 Oshawa–Finch Express

Construction
- Structure type: Underground
- Platform levels: 2
- Accessible: Yes
- Architect: Stevens Group Architects (Line 4)

Other information
- Website: Official station page

History
- Opened: Line 1: March 29, 1974; 52 years ago; Line 4: November 24, 2002; 23 years ago
- Former names: Sheppard (1974–2002)

Passengers
- 2023–2024: 57,501 (Line 1); 35,327 (Line 4); 92,828 (total)
- Rank: 4 of 70

Services
Preceding station	Toronto Transit Commission	Following station
York Mills towards Vaughan	Line 1 Yonge–University	North York Centre towards Finch
Terminus	Line 4 Sheppard	Bayview towards Don Mills
Track layout
Location

Sheppard–Yonge (formerly Sheppard) is an interchange station on Line 1 Yonge–University and Line 4 Sheppard of the Toronto subway. The station is located at the southern end of North York City Centre. It is the fourth-busiest station in the system, after Bloor–Yonge, St. George and Union, serving a combined total of approximately 92,828 people per day in 2023–2024.

== History ==
Sheppard–Yonge first opened as Sheppard in 1974, when the Yonge–University subway line was extended north from Eglinton to Finch. The extension was planned to open in two stages with Sheppard as the temporary terminus, but construction north of York Mills was delayed by various problems and in 1973, York Mills was opened as the temporary terminus instead; Sheppard and Finch stations opened in 1974. The H-2 class subway cars delivered in 1971 included destination signs for "Sheppard via downtown" on the expectation that it would be a terminal station.

The station was expanded and renamed "Sheppard–Yonge" in 2002 with the opening of the Sheppard subway line, for which this station became the western terminus. The renaming was similar to that of Bloor–Yonge station. Unlike Bloor–Yonge, where the signs on Line 1 platforms still read "Bloor" and those on the Line 2 Bloor–Danforth read "Yonge", Sheppard–Yonge is given its full name on both sets of platforms; all existing signs within the station were changed to give the new name. At that time, this station became accessible with elevators. When the automated announcements were installed on Toronto's subway trains between 2006 and 2007, on Line 1 trains they referred to the station as "Sheppard" while on Line 4 trains, the station was referred to as "Sheppard–Yonge". The announcements on the Toronto Rocket subway trains introduced between 2011 and 2016 refer to the station on both Lines 1 and 4 as "Sheppard–Yonge", followed by – as of December 2025 – "transfer for Line 4 Sheppard" or "transfer for Line 1 Yonge–University" and "GO Transit", respectively.

== Station description ==
The station is located under Yonge Street at Sheppard Avenue, and is built on five levels. All seven entrances are located at street level, as is the bus platform. The three levels below are concourse levels, which provide access to the bus platform and the two subway lines. The subway platforms are on the two lower levels, with the Yonge–University line on the bottom and the newer Sheppard line crossing above.

== Entrances ==
There are six entrances – five automated entrances and one staffed entrance:

- An accessible automatic entrance on the northeast side of Yonge Street and Sheppard Avenue beside the Yonge Sheppard Centre. This was a staffed entrance until October 21, 2019, when the collector booth was closed.
- An accessible staffed entrance accessed via the Hullmark Centre entrance on the southeast corner of Yonge and Sheppard
- An accessible automatic entrance accessed via a private elevator in the Nestle Canada Building at 25 Sheppard Avenue West, one block west of Yonge
- An automatic entrance at Harlandale and Yonge, one block north of Sheppard
- An automatic entrance on the northeast corner of Yonge Street and Anndale Drive, accessed via the Procter & Gamble building (Monday to Friday 6 am to 7 pm, excluding holidays) or via the underground parking lot of Whole Foods Market (Note: While this entrance is equipped with a private elevator from the Whole Foods Market at street level to the building's parking garages and the fares concourse level, it does not serve the Line 1 subway platform.)
- An automatic entrance accessed via the Emerald Park building on the northwest corner of Yonge Street at Poyntz Avenue (Note: While this entrance is equipped with a private elevator from street level to the building's parking garages and the fares concourse level, it does not serve the Line 1 subway platform.)

== Architecture and art ==
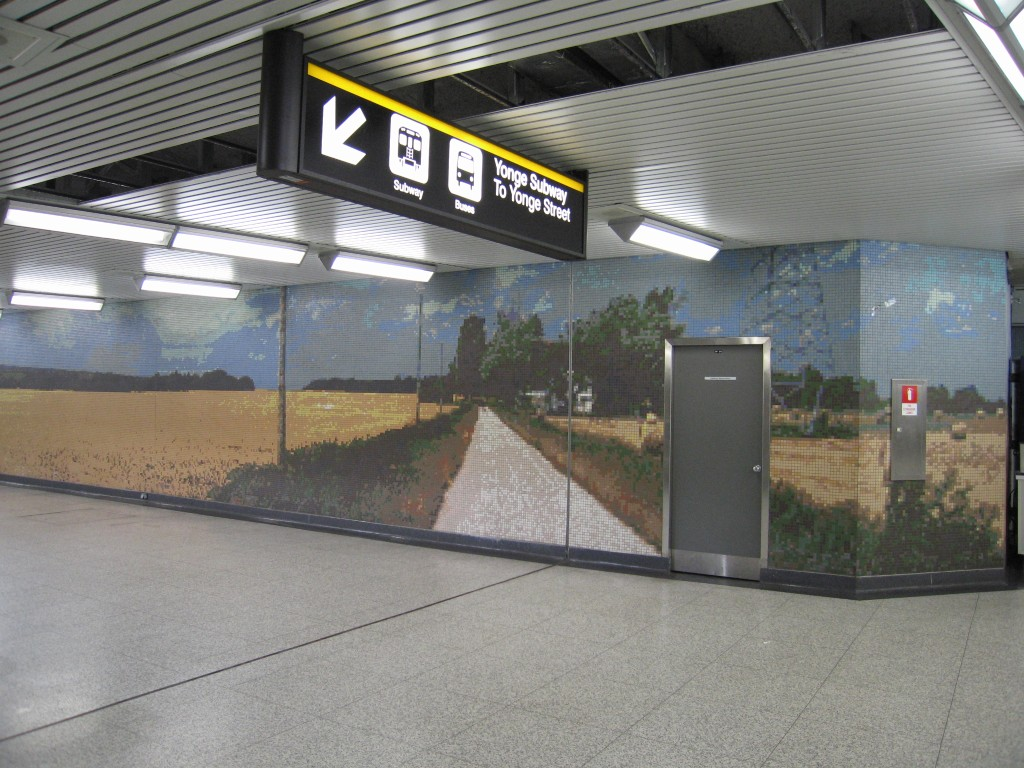
Spiegel's Immersion Land

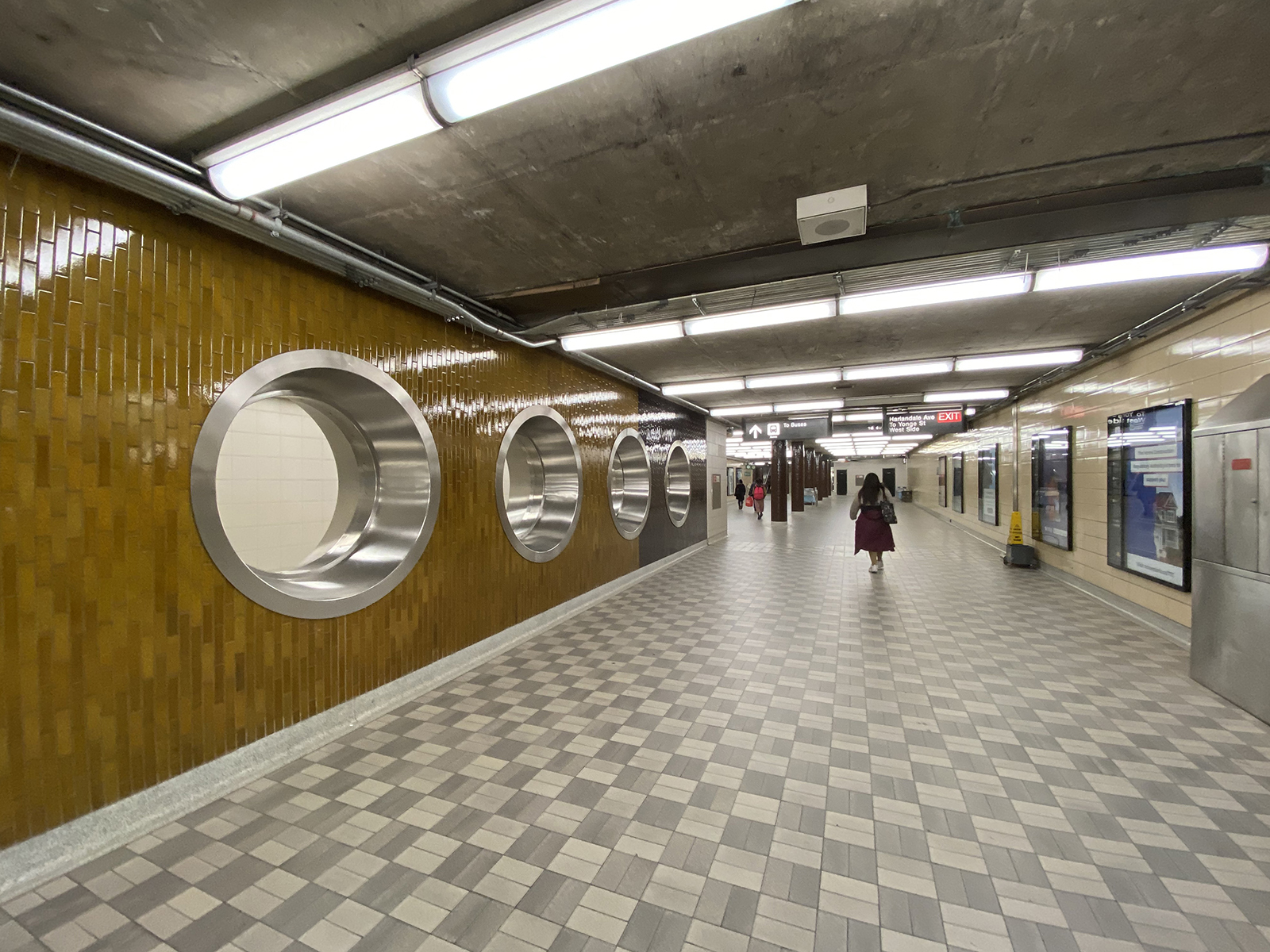
Circle wall

The station on the Sheppard line was designed by architectural firm NORR Limited. The construction of the Sheppard line included the integration of the bus terminal at street level into the fare-paid zone.

The artwork in the station, entitled Immersion Land and created by the artist Stacey Spiegel, consists of panoramic posterized murals created from 150 digital photos rendered onto single-colour mosaic tiles. The artwork depicts rural scenery along Yonge Street or Highway 11 somewhere between Lake Ontario and North Bay, and is located on the upper (Line 4 Sheppard) platform level.

== Subway infrastructure in the vicinity ==
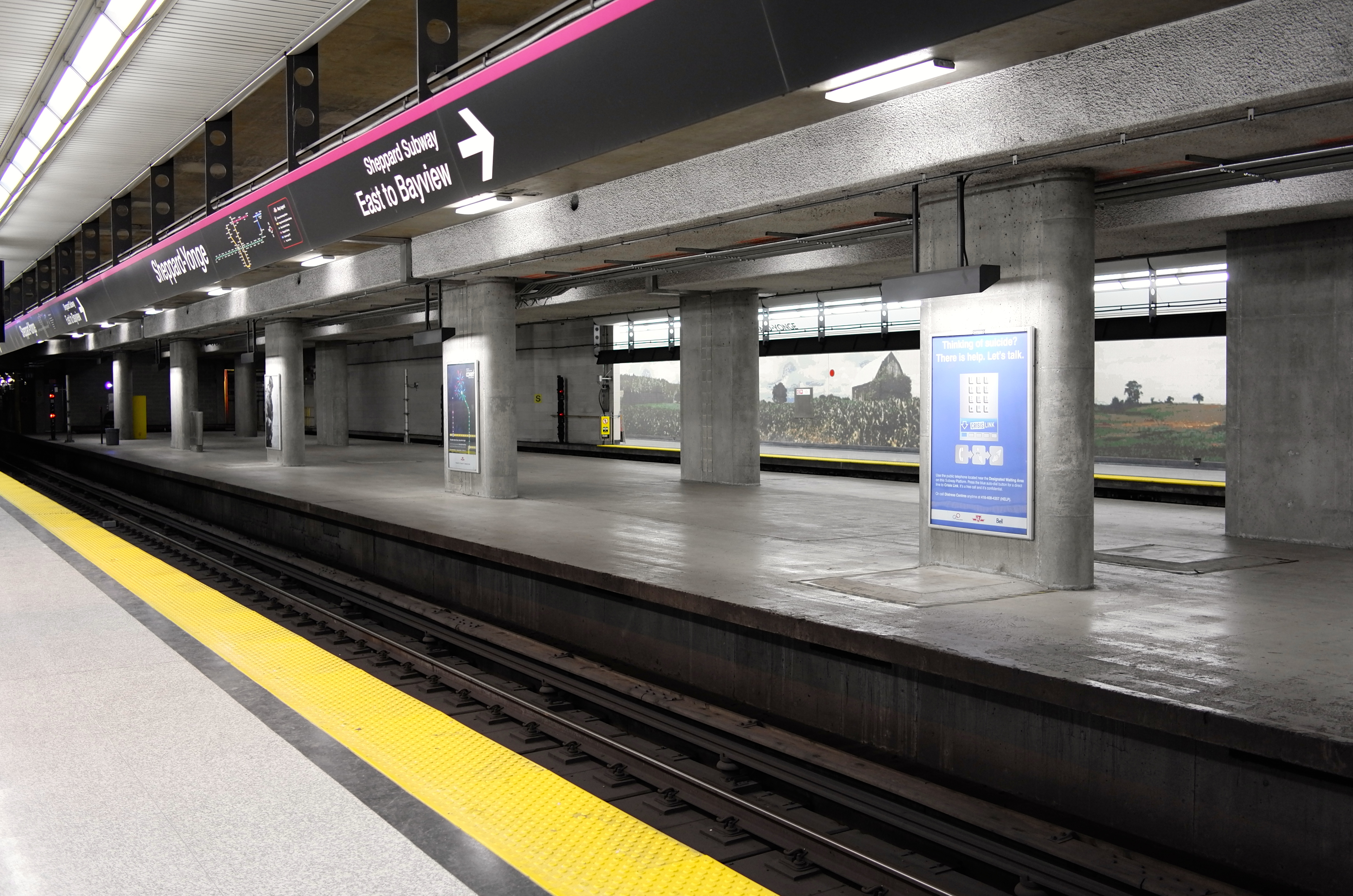
The Line 4 platform has a roughed-in extra centre platform designed to be potentially used as a Spanish solution in the future.

The Sheppard line tracks cross above the Yonge line. Line 4 has side platforms (unique among TTC terminal stations), but there is also a roughed-in centre platform. Should the station become a busy transfer point, this platform will be opened and trains will open all their doors, allowing riders to enter on one side and exit on the other to improve efficiency.

Both lines have a crossover just beyond the platforms, with Line 1's being to the south and Line 4's to the east. As Sheppard-Yonge is a terminus for Line 4, its crossover is used to regularly reverse trains, with Line 1's being used only for occasional short turns. Trains normally pull into the south platform on Line 4 to allow passengers to board and alight before returning in the direction from which they came; the north platform is used only for passengers disembarking from trains that are going out of service.

A connecting track from the southbound Line 1 track south of the station, used only if non-revenue trains or work cars need to be transferred between the two lines, curves around to a point 500 metres (1,600 ft) west of Yonge on Line 4's single tail track, slightly more than one train-length east of the end of the track, with a second (which becomes the eastbound track) diverging from the connector, which passes under it. This provides an area where trains can be stored clear of the line. East of the station, Line 4 converges with a second connecting track from northbound Line 1.

== Surface connections ==
TTC routes serving the station include:

Bay number	Route	Name	Additional information
1	Spare		
2	Wheel-Trans		
2a	98C	Willowdale–Senlac	Eastbound to Steeles Avenue East via Willowdale Avenue
3	Spare		
3a	185	Sheppard Central	Eastbound to Don Mills station
4	Spare		
4a	98C	Willowdale–Senlac	Westbound to Peckham Avenue via Senlac Road
5	Spare		
5a	84A	Sheppard West	Westbound to Weston Road
5a	84C	Sheppard West	Westbound to Steeles Avenue via Arrow Road; (Rush hour service)
5a	84D	Sheppard West	Westbound to Pioneer Village station via Oakdale Road; (Rush hour service)
6	Spare		
6a	984A	Sheppard West Express	Westbound to Weston Road; (Rush hour service)

Nearby TTC routes serving the station include:

Route	Name	Additional information
97A	Yonge	Northbound to Steeles Avenue and southbound to St. Clair station; (On-street stop outside station)
97B	Yonge	Northbound to Steeles Avenue and southbound to St. Clair station via Yonge Boulevard; (On-street stop outside station)
320	Yonge	Blue Night service; northbound to Steeles Avenue and southbound to Queens Quay; (On-street stop outside the station)
384	Sheppard West	Blue Night service; westbound to Steeles Avenue West and Islington Avenue via Weston Road; (On-street stop outside the station)
385	Sheppard East	Blue Night service; eastbound to Rouge Hill GO Station; (On-street stop outside the station)
