= Norman N. Holland =

American literary critic

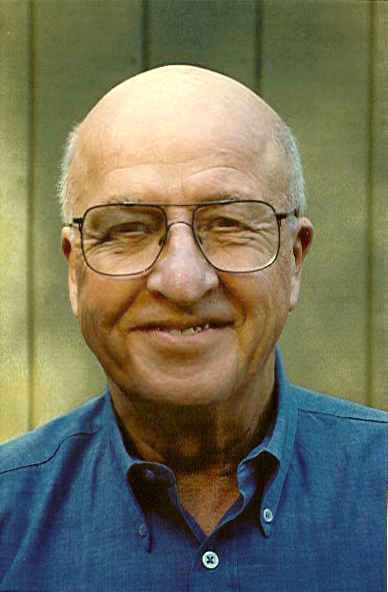
Norman N. Holland

Norman N. Holland (September 19, 1927, New York City - September 28, 2017) was an American literary critic and Marston-Milbauer Eminent Scholar Emeritus at the University of Florida.

Holland's scholarship focused largely on psychoanalytic criticism and cognitive poetics, subjects on which he wrote fifteen books and nearly 250 scholarly articles. He is widely recognized for his scholarship specifically related to psychoanalytic applications in literary study. He was known as a major scholar of literary theory, primarily for having been one of the pioneers of reader-response criticism. Holland's writings have been translated into Chinese, Dutch, Persian, French, German, Italian, Japanese, Korean, Hungarian, Polish, Russian, Spanish, and Turkish.

== Academic positions and professional history ==
Holland received a B.S. in electrical engineering in 1947 from the Massachusetts Institute of Technology (MIT) and a J.D. in 1950 from Harvard Law School. As his interests shifted from patent law to literature he was accepted as a doctoral student at Harvard University, where he received his Ph.D. in English Literature in 1956. He then accepted an appointment in MIT's School of Humanities, where he taught until 1966, becoming head of the literature section. Holland also trained at the Boston Psychoanalytic Society and Institute, graduating in 1966. In the same year he accepted a position as chair of the Department of English at the State University of New York at Buffalo, where he became McNulty Professor. In 1983, he was named a Marston-Milbauer Eminent Scholar by the University of Florida, where he taught until his retirement in 2008.

Holland received an American Council of Learned Societies Fellowship in 1974-75 and a Guggenheim Fellowship in 1979 to 1980.

Holland served on several committees of the Modern Language Association (MLA) and was a member and nominating committee chair of the English Institute. He was also a member of the following organizations: the Association Internationale d'Esthétique Experimentale, the Shakespeare Association of America, the International Association of University Professors of English (IAUPE), the Society for Cinema and Media Studies (editor and council member, 1963), the Boston Psychoanalytic Society and Institute (affiliate member, 1965- ), and the Western New York Psychoanalytic Society (1969-1983). He was also a founder and steering committee member of the Buffalo, Gainesville, and Boston branches of the Group for Applied Psychoanalysis.

Since 1976, Holland served as a scientific associate at the American Academy of Psychoanalysis and Dynamic Psychiatry and since 1981 had been on the advisory board of the D. W. Winnicott Library. He participated in the Personal Testimony Group of the Social Science Research Council (SSRC) and in the Tampa Psychoanalytic Study Group since 1985.

In 1993, Holland founded the PSYART online discussion group and was its active moderator. He was also the founder and former editor of PsyArt: A Hyperlink Journal for the Psychology of the Arts, which has been in publication since 1997. The PSYART activities was recently consolidated into the PSYART Foundation thanks to a generous grant from Holland and his late wife. He also served on the editorial boards of the Psychoanalytic Review and the peer-reviewed, interdisciplinary journal, Projections: The Journal for Movies and Mind.

Besides being the Marston-Milbauer Eminent Scholar at the University of Florida, Holland also held more than a dozen membership roles, board positions and teaching appointments. Some such major appointments and memberships include: Member of the McKnight Brain Institute, visiting professorships at Stanford University, Ben-Gurion University of the Negev and University of Paris VII (Charles V) and University of Paris VIII (Vincennes - Saint-Denis), and the director of the Center for the Psychological Study of the Arts at SUNY Buffalo.

== New Criticism ==
The First Modern Comedies (1959), the first of Holland's major publications, is a New Critical study of the three major writers of Restoration comedy. This publication was followed by The Shakespearean Imagination (1964), a guide to reading Shakespeare's works and Holland's New Critical analyses of thirteen major plays of Shakespeare. The book derived from a Shakespeare program on WGBH_TV that Holland gave as part of the extension program at Harvard.

== Psychoanalytic criticism ==
Holland's publications on psychoanalytic criticism include Psychoanalysis and Shakespeare (1966), which summarizes what psychoanalysis had had to say about Shakespeare up to that time and proposes that the roles of readers and audiences are more important to literary criticism than previously understood. The themes introduced in Psychoanalysis and Shakespeare led to his 1968 book, The Dynamics of Literary Response, which provides a model of literary response in which the reader introjects a process of psychological transformation (from unconscious fantasy toward conscious significance) that is embodied in the literary work.

Other texts edited or written by Holland on the subject of psychoanalytic criticism include: Shakespeare's Personality (1989; with Bernard J. Paris and Sidney Homan) and Holland's Guide to Psychoanalytic Psychology and Literature-and-Psychology (1990).

== Reader-response theory ==
Poems in Persons: An Introduction to the Psychoanalysis of Literature (1973; rev. ed. 2000) proposes a very different model of literary processing based on a psychoanalytic theory of identity. The central argument of the text is that writers create texts as expressions of their personal identities and readers re-create their own identities when they respond. These identities can be understood as a central theme or themes and behavioral variations on them, much like a theme-and-variations in music.

5 Readers Reading (1975) pursues this conclusion based on case studies of five university students who gave free association responses (according to psychoanalytic technique) to three short stories. They showed that their literary experiences were shaped by readers' identities, and not by the texts they read.

Laughing: A Psychology of Humor (1982) surveyed theories of laughter. But the book extended the reader-response argument to show, based on a case study of one woman, how what one finds funny, that is, one's sense of humor, expresses one's personal identity.

== The Delphi Seminar ==
During the 1970s, Holland and his colleague at the State University of New York at Buffalo, Murray Schwartz, developed a style of reader-response teaching that they named the "Delphi Seminar." The original seminar included students and instructors practicing free association responses to poems and stories and subsequent readings of other participants’ free associations as primary texts.

In 1995, Holland published a mystery novel based on the Delphi seminars entitled Death in a Delphi Seminar: A Postmodern Mystery. The story takes place in an English department, and the reader is led through the text using reader-response theory to understand the characters and the crime. Know Thyself: Delphi Seminars (2009) by Holland and Schwartz provides an overview of the Delphi Seminar teaching style and lays out the seminar's findings.

== Literature and cognitive science ==
The I (1985) extends the holistic method employed by Holland in his previously published case studies of readers. In the text, Holland proposes general processes of perception and symbolization that are applicable throughout life. The text elaborates a "model of mind" based on psychological concepts of feedback, and illustrates how individuals both use, and are constrained by, their bodies, their culture, and their "interpretive communities" as well as their personalities or identities. Using conclusions set forth by psychoanalytic theory, The I combines Holland's theory of the role of identity in people's perceptions and behavior, and the psychoanalytic stages of childhood and adult development.

In The Brain of Robert Frost: A Cognitive Approach to Literature (1988), Holland draws on neurological evidence of a "growing and ungrowing" of the brain in mammalian development to show how an identity theme might come into being in the body. Additionally, this text develops a three-tier feedback model of the mind, which illustrates that the brain deals with its world by hypothesizing through physiology, through fixed codes and flexible canons derived from culture, and through personal identity.

The Critical I (1992) further develops the model set forth in The Brain of Robert Frost and includes a critical attack on the postmodern idea of the disappearance of the self.

== Television appearances ==
Holland was The Film Critic weekly from 1957 to 1959 on WGBH-TV in Boston, and he presented for Harvard's Lowell Institute a weekly 30-minute program, The Shakespearean Imagination in 1963 also on WGBH-TV.

== Personal life ==
Holland was born in New York City to Norman N. Holland, a patent lawyer, and Harriette Holland, also a lawyer. In 1954, he married Jane Kelley (deceased in 2015). At the end of his life, he resided in Gainesville, Florida. He was survived by two children and four grandchildren.
