= South Australian Railways N class =

Class of Australian 4-6-0 locomotives

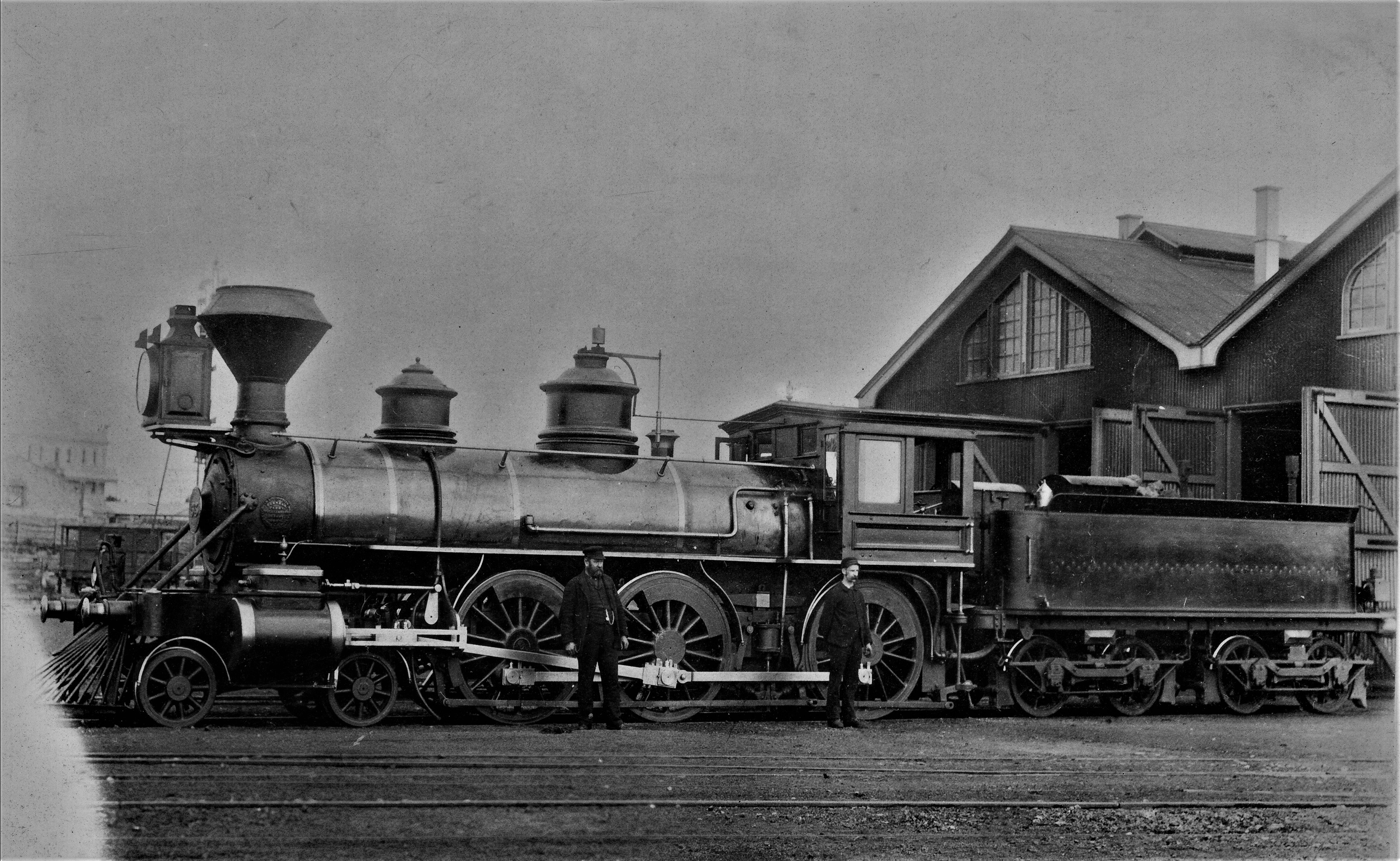
- South Australian Railways N class No. 53
Type and origin
- Power type: Steam
- Builder: Baldwin Locomotive Works
- Serial number: 5238 & 5241
- Build date: 1881
- Total produced: 2
- Rebuilder: Islington Railway Workshops
- Rebuild date: 1904
- Number rebuilt: 2
Specifications
- Configuration
  - Whyte: 4-6-0
  - UIC: 2'C 2'2'
- Gauge: 5 ft 3 in (1,600 mm)
- Driver dia.: 5 ft 0 in (1,524 mm)
- Length: 57 ft 10 in (17.63 m) (Original); 57 ft 8 5/8 in (17.59 m) (Rebuilt)
- Axle load: 12 long tons 5 cwt (27,400 lb or 12.4 t) (Original); 12 long tons 14 cwt (28,400 lb or 12.9 t) (Rebuilt)
- Total weight: 83 long tons 5 cwt (186,500 lb or 84.6 t) (Original); 93 long tons 7 cwt (209,100 lb or 94.8 t) (Rebuilt)
- Fuel type: Coal
- Fuel capacity: 5 long tons 6 cwt (11,900 lb or 5.4 t) (Original); 5 long tons 0 cwt (11,200 lb or 5.1 t) (Rebuilt)
- Water cap.: 3,000 imp gal (3,600 US gal; 14,000 L) (Original); 4,000 imp gal (4,800 US gal; 18,000 L) (Rebuilt)
- Firebox
  - Grate area: 19 sq ft (1.8 m^{2})
- Boiler pressure: 130 psi (900 kPa) (Original); 175 psi (1,210 kPa) (Rebuilt)
- Heating surface
  - Firebox: 113 sq ft (10.5 m^{2}) (Original); 121 sq ft (11.2 m^{2}) (Rebuilt)
  - Tubes: 1,190 sq ft (111 m^{2}) (Original); 1,480 sq ft (137 m^{2}) (Rebuilt)
- Cylinders: 2
- Cylinder size: 19 in × 24 in (483 mm × 610 mm)
Performance figures
- Tractive effort: 15,950 lbf (70.9 kN) (Original); 21,420 lbf (95.3 kN) (Rebuilt)
Career
- Operators: South Australian Railways
- Class: N
- Number in class: 2
- Numbers: 52 & 53
- First run: 10.3.1881
- Withdrawn: 1925-1927
- Scrapped: 1925-1928
- Disposition: Both scrapped

The South Australian Railways N class locomotives were built in 1881 by the Baldwin Locomotive Works for the South Australian Railways (S.A.R.). They were rebuilt in 1904, which vastly improved their performance and completely changed their look from a typical American locomotive of the time to a more British one.

== History ==
The N class locomotives, along with two O class engines, were imported from Baldwin Locomotive Works in the United States, for the South Australian Railways. The two O class units were essentially goods engines, but the N class locomotives were made for working passenger trains on the new "Intercolonial Railway", which ran through the Adelaide Hills. They were the first to be fitted with bogie tenders. When they were originally brought into service in 1881, they were allocated to run passenger and mixed trains between Adelaide and Kapunda. On 14 March 1883, N class locomotive No. 52 was rostered to haul the train, with the State Governor on board, to officially open the line between Adelaide and Aldgate. With a great deal of difficulty, it managed to haul the train to Blackwood, where it finally broke down. Later that day, it eventually finished the trip to Aldgate, with only the Vice-Regal and Ministerial carriages attached.

N class locomotives continued to run services through the Adelaide Hills and on some occasions worked to Strathalbyn. In 1904, both N classes were rebuilt at Islington Railway Workshops, which completely changed their appearance from the classic American design of that period to a more conventional British outline. Along with the rebuilding, the locomotives also got new bogie tenders. After they were rebuilt, the primary duty of the N class was hauling livestock trains between Adelaide and Terowie. Though the N class locomotives were then capable of fulfilling the duties of the Rx class locomotives, they still worked on livestock trains. The rebuilt N class roamed their way around the S.A.R. system until both were withdrawn in the mid 1920s.
