= Matthias Kohring =

- Born: Dortmund, North Rhine-Westphalia, West Germany
- Education: University of Münster, Technical University of Ilmenau, University of Jena
- Known for: Journalism Theory; Science Journalism; the Public Sphere; Trust (social sciences)

Matthias Kohring (born 1965) is a German professor for Media and Communication studies at the University of Mannheim focusing on the area of Journalism Theory, Science journalism, Public Media, and Trust in Media.

== Life and career ==
After graduating in Journalism and Communication studies, Political science and German studies at the University of Münster, Kohring wrote his PhD thesis about the "Function of Science Journalism".

In the years from 1996 to 1998, he was a research assistant for an Applied Media course at the TU Ilmenau followed by a position as a research assistant in the area of Media studies at the University of Jena. There he reached his habilitation in 2004 with his work about "Trust in Journalism". He has led several research projects for the DFG as well as for the EU about Risk communication und about trust in media. In 2005 and 2006, he worked as a substitute professor for Communication studies at the University of Münster. In late 2006, he then accepted a professorship for Communication studies with a main focus on Media sociology and Media psychology.

He has been a professor for Media und Communication studies at the University of Mannheim since 2010 und is currently dean of the Mannheim School of Humanities.

Matthias Kohring is married and father of three children.

== Selected bibliography ==
- Matthias Kohring: Vertrauen in Journalismus. Theorie und Empirie Universitätsverlag, Konstanz 2004, ISBN 3896694421.
- Matthias Kohring: Wissenschaftsjournalismus: Forschungsüberblick und Theorieentwurf Universitätsverlag, Konstanz 2005, ISBN 3896694820.
