= Hans Robert Jauss =

German academic (1921–1997)

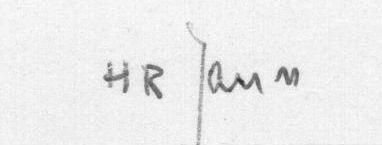
Signature of Hans Robert Jauss, 1972

Hans Robert Jauss (German: Jauß or Jauss; 12 December 1921 – 1 March 1997) was a German academic, notable for his work in reception theory (especially his concept of horizon of expectation) and medieval and modern French literature. His approach was derived from the hermeneutics of Hans-Georg Gadamer.

== Early years and education ==
Jauss was born in Göppingen, Württemberg, Germany, and died on 1 March 1997 in Constance, Germany. His family came from a long line of teachers. His religious background was pietism. Jauss’s Gymnasium studies took place in Esslingen and Geislingen between 1932 and 1939. As a young soldier in the Second World War, Jauss spent two winters on the Russian Front in the SS (SS-Nr. 401.359) and the Waffen-SS. In 1942, he was a member of the "SS-Freiwilligen-Legion Niederlande". In 1943, he was Obersturmführer in the "11th SS-Freiwilligen-Legion Nordland". In 1944, he was Hauptsturmführer in the SS reserve. Subsequently, he was part of the "33rd Waffen-Grenadier-Division der SS Charlemagne".

In 1944, he was able to begin his studies and complete his first semester in occupied Prague. In November 1948 at Heidelberg, the twenty-seven-year-old Jauss, after postwar imprisonment, began studies in Romance philology, philosophy, history and Germanistik (German literature and linguistics). Teachers at that time who made an impact on his thought included Martin Heidegger and Hans Georg Gadamer. He was to remain there until 1954. In these years he made study trips to Paris and Perugia.

The themes of past and the present, time and remembrance, were already engaging Jauss’s research from the time of his doctorate at the University of Heidelberg in 1952. His dissertation, under the direction of the philologist Gerhard Hess, was entitled Zeit und Erinnerung in Marcel Prousts «À la recherche du temps perdu» [Time and Memory in Marcel Proust's In Search of Lost Time].

In 1957, with the treatise Untersuchungen zur mittelalterlichen Tierdichtung, he obtained his habilitation for Romance philology at the University of Heidelberg.

== Career ==
In 1959, Jauss took up his first teaching appointment as associate professor and director of the Romance Seminar at the University of Münster, Westfalen. In 1961, he moved to the University of Gießen, where, as full professor, he helped in the restructuring of the Romance Seminar.

It was in these years (1959–1962) that Jauss, along with Erich Köhler, founded a series of medieval texts entitled Grundriß der romanischen Literaturen des Mittelalters (Outline of Romance Literatures of the Middle Ages). In 1963, he also played a prominent role in establishing the research group "Poetik und Hermeneutik" with two other colleagues from Gießen (Hans Blumenberg and Clemens Heselhaus), along with Wolfgang Iser from Würzburg.

The year 1966 saw the founding of the University of Constance as part of the reform of the German university system taking place at that time. Jauss was invited by his former teacher Gerhard Hess to join the staff. Doing away with previous autonomous institutes, the new university at Constance was set up with a cooperative and cross-disciplinary structure of "Units of Teaching and Research," following the Humboldt principle of developing teaching out of research. Working on numerous committees, Jauss was particularly involved with setting up the "subject area" (Fachbereiche) of literary studies (Literaturwissenschaft), an innovative structure at the time but soon to be emulated throughout Germany. Five professors, surrendering the privileges of departmental chairmanship in their different language fields, organised themselves into a research group that soon became known internationally as "The Constance School": Wolfgang Iser (English), Wolfgang Preisendanz (German), Manfred Fuhrmann (Latin), Hans Robert Jauss (Romance), and Jurij Striedter (Slavic). Jauss’s own inaugural lecture in 1967, entitled "Literary History as a Challenge to Literary Theory", was dramatic and programmatic in its call for a new approach to literary studies. The ensuing years saw an application and development of that program, at times in vigorous debate with a diversity of dialogue partners.

Throughout his career, he was guest professor at the University of Zürich (winter semester 1967/68); at the Freie Universität Berlin (winter semester 1968/69); at Columbia University, New York (Fall 1973); at Yale University, New Haven (Spring 1976; turning down an offer to go there again in 1977); at the Sorbonne (Paris IV, winter semester, 1978); at the University of Leuven (Franqui-Professur, 1982); at the University of California, Berkeley (Spring 1982); at the University of California (1985); at Princeton University (Whitney J. Oates Visiting Fellow, February 1986); and at the University of Wisconsin–Madison (Brittingham Visiting Professor of English, March 1986).

== Honors and death ==
In 1980 Jauss became a member of the Heidelberger Akademie der Wissenschaften. He was also honoured by the Italian Accademia dei Lincei. After his retirement on 1 April 1987 until his death in 1997, he lived near Konstanz as professor emeritus at the university. He died in Konstanz.

== Reevaluating Jauss's past ==
In 1995, Jauss' SS dossier was first published by the Romance scholar Earl Jeffrey Richards, as part of an evaluation of attacks by former Nazis on Ernst Robert Curtius. Richards later documented Jauss's various falsehoods and fabrications after the war. Despite his unmasking of Jauss's past, however, it would be another two decades before the academy as a whole took stock of his legacy.

In 2014, the University of Konstanz commissioned the historian Jens Westemeier to examine Jauss's political and war-time past, leading to its re-evaluation. Westemeier's research demonstrated that Jauss was likely involved in war crimes (as a company commander in 1943 in a unit that later became known as the 33rd Waffen Grenadier Division) and that Jauss falsified documents and glossed over his autobiography. Westemeier expanded on his work to later publish the monograph Hans Robert Jauß. Jugend, Krieg und Internierung (Hans Robert Jauss. Youth, War and Internment).

== Bibliography ==
- Jauss, Hans Robert. Aesthetic Experience and Literary Hermeneutics. Translated by Michael Shaw. Minneapolis: University of Minnesota Press, 1982.
- Jauss, Hans Robert. Toward an Aesthetic of Reception. Translated by Timothy Bahti. Minneapolis: University of Minnesota Press, 1982.
- Jauss, Hans Robert. Question and Answer: Forms of Dialogic Understanding. Translated by Michael Hays. Minneapolis: University of Minnesota Press. 1989.
- Jauss, Hans Robert. Wege des Verstehens. Munich: W. Fink, 1994.
