= Louise Rosenblatt =

American university professor (1904–2005)

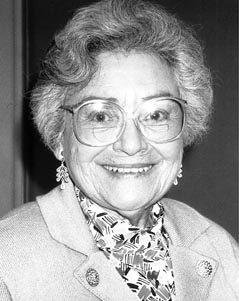
Louise M Rosenblatt

Louise Michelle Rosenblatt (23 August 1904 in Atlantic City, New Jersey – 8 February 2005 in Arlington, Virginia) was an American university professor. She is best known as a researcher into the teaching of literature.

== Biography ==
Rosenblatt was born in Atlantic City to Jewish immigrant parents. She attended Barnard College, the women's college at Columbia University in New York City, receiving a Bachelor of Arts degree in 1925. Her roommate was Margaret Mead, the anthropologist, who urged her to study anthropology. A year behind Mead at Barnard, Rosenblatt took over her position as editor-in-chief of the Barnard Bulletin. While Rosenblatt initially planned to travel to Samoa after graduation in order to do field research, she decided instead to continue her studies in France. In Paris, she met French author André Gide and American expatriates Gertrude Stein and Robert Penn Warren.

Rosenblatt obtained a Certitude d'études françaises from the University of Grenoble in 1926. She continued her studies in Paris, receiving a PhD in Comparative Literature from the Sorbonne in 1931. That same year she married Sidney Ratner, a professor at Rutgers University.

Rosenblatt published her first book in 1931. It was written in French and examined the "art for art's sake" movement that had stirred England in the latter portion of the nineteenth century.

Rosenblatt was enrolled as an instructor at Barnard College in 1931, and remained on the college's rolls through 1938. In 1938 she transferred to Brooklyn College, and remained on that college's rolls through 1948. In 1948 she became a Professor of English Education at New York University's School of Education, where she remained until her retirement in 1972. Subsequently, she held visiting professorships at Rutgers and the University of Miami, along with a number of other short term appointments, although she maintained residence at her long-term home in Princeton, New Jersey. In 2002 she moved to Arlington, Virginia, to live with her son Jonathan. She died of congestive heart failure at the Virginia Hospital Center in Arlington on 8 February 2005.

During World War II Rosenblatt worked for the United States Office of War Information, analyzing reports concerning or coming from France, which at that time was controlled by the Germans. Throughout her life, Rosenblatt was consistently involved in political activism. Carrying on a tradition from her family championing the "underdog," her editorials in the Barnard Bulletin spoke to her concern for building democratic institutions. She was a strong supporter of the National Association for the Advancement of Colored People (NAACP), her socialist instincts led her to support Norman Thomas, before moving to FDR in the 1930s, and later in the 1990s and 2000s, she wrote her representatives often to effect policy changes, especially in relation to the No Child Left Behind Act.

== Research and contributions ==
When Rosenblatt began teaching English Literature at Barnard, she developed an intense interest in each reader's unique response to a given text. Her views regarding literacy were influenced by John Dewey, who was in the philosophy department at Columbia in the 1930s, as well as Charles Sanders Peirce and William James.

She is best known for her two influential texts: Literature as Exploration (1938) was originally completed for the Commission on Human Relations and was a publication of the Progressive Education Association (it subsequently went through 5 editions); The Reader, The Text, The Poem: The Transactional Theory of the Literary Work (1978), in which she argues that the act of reading literature involves a transaction (Dewey's term) between the reader and the text. She argued that the meaning of any text lay not in the work itself but in the reader's transaction with it, whether it was a play by Shakespeare or a novel by Toni Morrison. Her work made her a well-known reader-response theorist. In her view, each "transaction" is a unique experience in which the reader and text continuously act and are acted upon by each other. A written work (often referred to as a "poem" in her writing) does not have the same meaning for everyone, as each reader brings individual background knowledge, beliefs, and context into the reading act. Rosenblatt's idea of the reading process, however, does not lead to all readings being equally accurate. For the reader's part, he or she must pay close attention to every detail of the text and pay equal attention to his or her own responses. This process exemplifies not only reader-response criticism but also close reading. This inclusion of Rosenblatt's "transactional" theory within the designation "reader-response," however, needs to be contested. Rosenblatt herself contended that she was never propounding a view of reading centered on isolated, individual readers as was the case with "reception theory." Instead, the focus of her thinking throughout her long career was on how individuals came to negotiate their readings in social terms. Such an ongoing conversation between reader(s) and text(s) was her way of emphasizing the importance of literature for human development in democratic settings.

As part of her "transactional" theory, Rosenblatt distinguished between two kinds of reading, or "stances," which she viewed on a continuum between "efferent" and "aesthetic." Anchoring one end is Efferent reading, the most common kind, in which the reader seeks to derive information from the text. In this instance, a reader is concerned mainly or totally with the gist, the message, the information, he or she can "carry away," which is what "efferent" means, conducting away. Such a reader does not care about how the text is worded. In contrast, if a reader approaches a text seeking to enjoy its formal characteristics—its rhythms, its word choices, its images, its connotations—then that person is reading "aesthetically." Such a reader hopes to participate in an aesthetic experience, much like listening to a great musical composition or viewing a beautiful painting. That is what "aesthetic" means, perceiving something beautiful. Rosenblatt, however, was never just interested in formalism or "beauty" in any rarified sense. She was more concerned with the nuts and bolts of language cognition, citing people like Elizabeth Bates and Ragnar Rommetveit, which led her to emphasize the role of the interpretant in mediating between signified and signifier, or between sign and referent (Peirce's triadic model). The individual reader therefore has to draw upon personal experiences in order to infuse aesthetic significance to a word and by extension, a set of words, such as in a poem. In aesthetic reading the emphasis is more on the journey experienced, which reveals her debt to Romanticism and its emphasis on the sensuous, on the emotions. Aesthetic reading would also help individual readers to grow in self-reflection and self-criticism, working out why they evoked a literary work the way they did, and that this would spur them to talk to others about their experiences with the same text. It is precisely this social behavior of the individual reader that placed Rosenblatt's thinking in the realm of democracy.

== Works ==
- L’Idée de l’art pour l’art dans la littérature anglaise pendant la période victorienne. Paris: Champion. (1931)
- Literature as Exploration (1938). Literature as Exploration. New York: Appleton-Century; (1968). New York: Noble and Noble; (1976). New York: Noble and Noble; (1983). New York: Modern Language Association; (1995). New York: Modern Language Association
- "Toward a cultural approach to literature", in College English, 7, 459-466. (1946)
- "The enriching values of reading". In W. Gray (Ed.), Reading in an age of mass communication (pp. 19–38). Freeport, NY: Books for Libraries. (1949)
- "The acid test in the teaching of literature". English Journal, 45, 66-74. (1956)
- Research development seminar in the teaching of English. New York: New York University Press. (1963)
- "The poem as event" in College English, 26, 123-8. (1964)
- "A way of happening", in Educational Record, 49, 339-346. (1968)
- "Towards a transactional theory of reading", in Journal of Reading Behavior, 1(1), 31-51. (1969)
- "Literature and the invisible reader", in The Promise of English: NCTE 1970 distinguished lectures. Champaign, IL: National Council of Teachers of English. (1970)
- The Reader, The Text, The Poem: The Transactional Theory of the Literary Work, Carbondale, IL: Southern Illinois University Press (1978). Carbondale, IL: Southern Illinois University Press (reprint 1994)
- "What facts does this poem teach you?", in Language Arts, 57, 386-94. (1980)
- "The transactional theory of the literary work: Implications for research", in Charles Cooper. (Ed.), Researching response to literature and the teaching of literature. Norwood, NJ: Ablex. (1985)
- "Viewpoints: Transaction versus interaction — a terminological rescue operation", in Research in the Teaching of English, 19, 96-107. (1985)
- "The aesthetic transaction", in Journal of Aesthetic Education, 20 (4), 122-128. (1986)
- "Literary Theory", in J. Flood, J. Jensen, D. Lapp, & J. Squire (Eds.), Handbook of research on teaching the English language arts (pp. 57–62). New York: Macmillan. (1991)
- Making Meaning with Texts: Selected Essays. Portsmouth, NH: Heinemann. (2005)

== Awards and recognitions ==
When she retired in 1972, Rosenblatt received New York University's Great Teacher award.

In 1992 Rosenblatt was inducted into the International Reading Association's Reading Hall of Fame.

She received the John Dewey Society Lifetime Achievement Award in 2001.

Rosenblatt made her final public appearance in Indianapolis in November 2004 at age 100, speaking to a standing-room-only session of a convention of English teachers.
