= Shirley Fiske =

American anthropologist

Shirley Fiske is an environmental and policy anthropologist. She is an anthropology professor at the University of Maryland. From 2011 to 2014, Fiske served as chair of the American Anthropological Association's Task Force on Global Climate Change. In 2016, she received the Solon T. Kimball Award for Public and Applied Anthropology award from the American Anthropological Association.

== Biography ==
Fiske obtained her Ph.D. in cultural anthropology from Stanford University. After, she joined the National Oceanic and Atmospheric Administration (NOAA) where she worked for 16 years. Fiske was also involved with communities and businesses along U.S. coastline when she worked for the National Sea Grant College Program. She became the legislative aide of Hawaii Senator Daniel K. Akala for energy, natural resources, oceans, and the environment.

== Publications ==
- Shirley Fiske and Robert M. Wulff, eds. 1986. Anthropological Praxis. Boulder: Westview Press,
- Shirley Fiske. 2009. Global change policymaking from inside the Beltway: engaging anthropology. Walnut Creek: Left Coast Press.
- Shirley Fiske. 2012. Global climate change from the bottom up. Walnut Creek: Left Coast Press.
- Shirley Fiske and Stephanie Paladino, eds. 2016. The Carbon Fix: Forest Carbon, Social Justice, and Environmental Governance. Walnut Creek: Left Coast Press.
