= N-word (disambiguation) =

The N-word is commonly used as a euphemism for nigger, an ethnic slur directed at black people.

(The) N-word may also refer to:

- The N-Word (film), a 2004 documentary film
- The N Word: One Man's Stand, a 2005 autobiography by Stephen Hagan
- The N-Word of the Narcissus, a 2009 rework of the 1897 novel The Nigger of the "Narcissus"
- "N Word", a 2013 song by Ice Prince from Fire of Zamani
- In Danish grammar, a linguistic term meaning "of common grammatical gender"
- Nigga
