= Encoding/decoding model of communication =

Cultural studies model

The encoding/decoding model of communication emerged in rough and general form in 1948 in Claude E. Shannon's "A Mathematical Theory of Communication," where it was part of a technical schema for designating the technological encoding of signals. Gradually, it was adapted by communications scholars, most notably Wilbur Schramm, in the 1950s, primarily to explain how mass communications could be effectively transmitted to a public, its meanings intact by the audience (i.e., decoders). As the jargon of Shannon's information theory moved into semiotics, notably through the work of thinkers Roman Jakobson, Roland Barthes, and Umberto Eco, who in the course of the 1960s began to put more emphasis on the social and political aspects of encoding. It became much more widely known, and popularised, when adapted by cultural studies scholar Stuart Hall in 1973, for a conference addressing mass communications scholars. In a Marxist twist on this model, Stuart Hall's study, titled "Encoding and Decoding in the Television Discourse", offered a theoretical approach to how media messages are produced, disseminated, and interpreted. Hall proposed that audience members can play an active role in decoding messages as they rely on their own social contexts and capability of changing messages through collective action.

Thus, encoding/decoding is the translation needed for a message to be easily understood. When you decode a message, you extract the meaning of that message in ways to simplify it. Decoding has both verbal and non-verbal forms of communication: Decoding behavior without using words, such as displays of non-verbal communication. There are many examples, including observing body language and its associated emotions, e.g. monitoring signs when someone is upset, angry, or stressed where they use excessive hand/arm movements, crying, and even silence. Moreover, there are times when an individual can send a message across to someone, the message can be interpreted differently from person to person. Decoding is all about understanding others, based on the information given throughout the message being received. Whether there is a large audience or exchanging a message to one person, decoding is the process of obtaining, absorbing and sometimes utilizing information that was given throughout a verbal or non-verbal message.

Since advertisements can have multiple layers of meaning, they can be decoded in various ways and can mean something different to different people.

"The level of connotation of the visual sign, of its contextual reference and positioning in different discursive fields of meaning and association, is the point where already coded signs intersect with the deep semantic codes of a culture and take on additional more active ideological dimensions."

— Stuart Hall, 1980, "Encoding/decoding."

== Definition ==
The encoding of a message is the production of the message. It is a system of coded meanings, and in order to create that, the sender needs to understand how verbal (e.g. words, signs, images, video) and non-verbal (e.g. body language, hand gestures, face expressions) symbols for which he or she believes the receiver (that is, the decoder) will understand. The symbols can be words and numbers, images, face expressions, signals and/or actions. It is very important how a message will be encoded; it partially depends on the purpose of the message.

The decoding of a message is how an audience member is able to understand, and interpret the message. It is a process of interpretation and translation of coded information into a comprehensible form. The audience is trying to reconstruct the idea by giving meanings to symbols and by interpreting messages as a whole. Effective communication is accomplished only when the message is received and understood in the intended way. However, it is still possible for the message recipient to understand a message in a completely different way from what the encoder was trying to convey. This is when "distortions" or "misunderstandings" rise from "lack of equivalence" between the two sides in communicative exchange.

In his essay, Hall compares two models of communication. The first, the traditional model, is criticized for its linearity – sender/message/receiver – and for its lack of structured conception of various moments as a complex structure of relations. The author proposes the idea that there is more to the process of communication and, thus, advances a four-stage model of communication that takes into account the production, circulation, use and reproduction of media messages. In contrast to the traditional linear approach of the sender and receiver, he perceives each of these steps as both autonomous and interdependent. Hall further explains that the meanings and messages in the discursive "production" are organized through the operation of codes within the rules of "language." "Each stage will affect the message (or "product") being conveyed as a result of its 'discursive form' (e.g. practices, instruments, relations)." Therefore, once the discourse is accomplished, it must be translated into social practices in order to be completed and effective – "If no 'meaning' is taken, there can be no 'consumption'." Each of these steps helps define the one that follows, while remaining clearly distinct. Thus, even though each of these moments (stages) are equally important to the process as a whole, they do not completely ensure that the following moment will necessarily happen. "Each can constitute its own break or interruption of the 'passage of forms' on whose continuity the flow of effective production (i.e. reproduction) depends."

These four stages are:

1. Production – This is where the encoding, the construction of a message begins. Production process has its own "discursive" aspect, as it is also framed by meanings and ideas; by drawing upon society's dominant ideologies, the creator of the message is feeding off of society's beliefs, and values. Numerous factors are involved in the production process. On one hand "knowledge-in-use concerning the routines of production, technical skills, professional ideologies, institutional knowledge, definitions and assumptions, assumptions about the audience" form the "production structures of the television." On the other hand, "topics, treatments, agendas, events, personnel, images of the audience, 'definitions of the situation' from other sources and other discursive formations" form the other part of wider socio-cultural and political structure.
2. Circulation – How individuals perceive things: visual vs. written. How things are circulated influences how audience members will receive the message and put it to use. According to Philip Elliott the audience is both the "source" and the "receiver" of the television message. For example, circulation and reception of a media message are incorporated in the production process through numerous "feedbacks." So circulation and perception, although not identical, are certainly related to and involved into the production process.
3. Use (distribution or consumption) – For a message to be successfully "realized", "the broadcasting structures must yield encoded messages in the form of a meaningful discourse." This means that the message has to be adopted as a meaningful discourse and it has to be meaningfully decoded. However, the decoding/interpreting of a message requires active recipients.
4. Reproduction – This stage is directly after audience members have interpreted a message in their own way based on their experiences and beliefs. The decoded meanings are the ones with "an effect" (e.g. influence, instruct, entertain) with "very complex perceptual, cognitive, emotional, ideological or behavioral consequences." What is done with the message after it has been interpreted is where this stage comes in. At this point, you will see whether individuals take action after they have been exposed to a specific message.

Since discursive form plays such an important role in a communicative process, Hall suggests that "encoding" and "decoding" are "determinate moments." What he means by that is that an event, for example, cannot be transmitted in its "raw format." A person would have to be physically at the place of the event to see it in such format. Rather, he states that events can only be transported to the audience in the audio-visual forms of televisual discourse (that is, the message goes to processes of production and distribution). This is when the other determinant moment begins – decoding, or interpretation of the images and messages through a wider social, cultural, and political cognitive spectrum (that is, the processes of consumption and reproduction).

"The event must become a 'story' before it can become a communicative event."

- Stuart Hall, 1980, "Encoding/decoding"

== Application of model ==
This model has been adopted and applied by many media theorists since Hall developed it. Hall's work has been central to the development of cultural studies, a field that had started challenging the mainstream media effects models in 1960. The main focus was how audience members make meanings and understand reality through their use of cultural symbols in both print and visual media. Theorists such as Dick Hebdige, David Morley, and Janice Radway have been heavily influenced by Hall, and applied his theory to help develop their own:

Hebdige was a British cultural and critic scholar who studied under Hall at the Birmingham School of Cultural Studies. His model builds from Hall's idea of subculture. He is most known for his influential book Subculture: The Meaning of Style, where he argues that younger generations are challenging dominant ideologies by developing distinct styles and practices that manifest their separate identity, and subversions. His exploration of the punk subculture outlines the potential causes and influences of the punk movement, especially for the youth. His extensive study on subcultures and its resistance against mainstream society showed that the punk subculture used commodification to differentiate themselves from, or become accepted by, the mainstream. Hebdige believed that punk was incorporated into the media in an attempt to categorize it within society, and he critically examines this issue by applying Hall's theory of encoding and decoding.

David Morley is a sociologist who studies the sociology of the television audience. Known for being a key researcher in conducting The Nationwide Project in the late 1970s, Morley took this popular news program that aired daily on BBC. It reported on national news from London and the major events of the day, and was broadcast throughout the UK. He applied Hall's reception theory to study the encoding/decoding model of this news program. This study focused on the ways this program addressed the audience member and the ideological themes it presented. Morley then took it a step further and conducted qualitative research that included individuals with varying social backgrounds. This was where Hall's research came into play. He wanted to see how they would react to certain clips of the program based on Hall's three decoding methods: dominant/hegemonic, negotiated, or oppositional.

Janice Radway, an American literary and cultural studies scholar, conducted a study on women in terms of romance reading. In her book Reading the Romance: Women, Patriarchy and Popular Literature, Radway studied a group of midwestern women that were fans of romance novels. She argued that this cultural activity functioned as personal time for women that did not typically have any personal time to themselves. Although her work was not seen as scientific, and her study applied only to a small group of women, she was interested in interpreting how women could relate their everyday life to a fiction book. As a result, her study demonstrated that these studies define culture in very broad terms, because in the end culture is made up of the symbols of expression that society uses to make sense of everyday life. Radway's audience research worked off of Hall's theory of encoding/decoding. Studying how specific individuals receive and interpret messages based on their backgrounds was something that played a huge role in Radway's study on women. Some women related to the book and some identified as though they were characters in the book; but the meaning, dependent upon their backgrounds, identities and beliefs, circulates within society and is reinforced by Hall's theory of encoding/decoding.

== Three positions upon decoding messages ==
Hall argues that there are three positions that people may take upon decoding a television message. He argues three different positions because "decodings do not follow inevitably from encodings". Thus, just because a message is encoded on television in a particular way, it does not mean it will be decoded in its intended format. This lays the foundation for Hall's hypothetical positions—he needs multiple positions because there are multiple interpretations that could occur. These positions are known as the dominant-hegemonic position, the negotiated position, and the oppositional position.

=== Dominant/hegemonic position ===
The first position that he discusses is the dominant-hegemonic code. This code or position is one where the consumer takes the actual meaning directly, and decodes it exactly the way it was encoded. For instance, political and military elites primarily generated the politics of Northern Ireland and the Chilean Coup. These elites created the "hegemonic interpretations" Because these ideas were hegemonic interpretations, they became dominant. Hall demonstrates that if a viewer of a newscast on such topics decoded the message "in terms of the reference code in which it has been encoded" that the viewer would be "operating inside the dominant code" Thus, the dominant code involves taking the connotative meaning of a message in the exact way a sender intended a message to be interpreted (decoded). Under this framework, the consumer is located within the dominant point of view, and is fully sharing the texts codes and accepts and reproduces the intended meaning. Here, there is barely any misunderstanding because both the sender and receiver have the same cultural biases. This means that the intended message was created by the dominant class and that the recipient was also a part of the dominant point of view. And there is no misunderstanding between sender and receiver for they have similar cultural biases.

A modern-day example of the dominant-hegemonic code is described by communication scholar Garrett Castleberry in his article "Understanding Stuart Hall's 'Encoding/Decoding' Through AMC's Breaking Bad". Castleberry argues that there is a dominant-hegemonic "position held by the entertainment industry that illegal drug side-effects cause less damage than perceived". If this is the dominant code and television shows like Breaking Bad support such perceptions, then they are operating within the dominant code. Likewise, a viewer believing such perceptions will also be operating within the dominant-hegemonic code since they are decoding the message in the way it is intended.

=== Negotiated position ===
Another hypothetical position is the negotiated position. This position is a mixture of accepting and rejecting elements. Readers are acknowledging the dominant message, but are not willing to completely accept the message the way the encoder intended. The reader to a certain extent, shares the text's code and generally accepts the preferred meaning, but is simultaneously resisting and modifying it in a way which reflects their own experiences and interests.

Hall explains this when he states "decoding within the negotiated version contains a mixture of adaptive and oppositional elements: it acknowledges the legitimacy of the hegemonic definitions to make the grand significations (abstract), while, at a more restricted, situational (situated) level, it makes its own ground rules- it operates with exceptions to the rule". Basically, this means that people understand the dominant position, they generally believe the position, but they are in a situation where they must make up their own separate rules to coexist with the dominant position. Hall provides an example involving an Industrial Relations Bill. In his example, he shows how a factory worker may recognize and agree with the dominant position that a wage freeze is beneficial. However, while the worker may recognize that the wage freeze is needed, they may not be willing to partake in a wage freeze since it will directly affect them rather than others His example demonstrates that people may negotiate a code to work around their own beliefs and self-interests. This code is very much based on context.

Once more, Castleberry demonstrates the negotiated code at play in a modern-day television show. In Breaking Bad, protagonist Walter White's wife Skyler leaves him after she discovers that he is a methamphetamine cook, and many viewers had negotiated "an acceptance of Walter's sins, while communicating negative discourse concerning Skyler". This negative discourse, according to actress Anna Gunn, who portrayed Skyler, was because her character did not fit what was expected of a wife. This expectation could be seen as a dominant code. In addition, Walter's actions were against the dominant code. Because of these conflicting dominant codes, Castleberry implies that many viewers negotiated their own code where Walter's actions were acceptable due to Skyler's role as a non-traditional wife.

=== Oppositional position ===
Lastly, there is the oppositional position or code. Hall summarizes that a viewer can understand the literal (denotative) and connotative meanings of a message while decoding a message "in a globally contrary way." This means that a person recognizes that their meaning is not the dominant meaning, or what was intended, but alters the message in their mind to fit an "alternative framework of reference" It is more like that receiver decode a different message. Thus, readers' or viewers social situation has placed them in a directly oppositional relationship to the dominant code, and although they understand the intended meaning they do not share the text's code and end up rejecting it. Again, this code is based very much on experiences. One's personal experiences will likely influence them to take on the oppositional position when they encode hegemonic positions. Highly political discourse emerges from these oppositional codes as "events which are normally signified and decoded in a negotiated way begin to be given an oppositional reading."

== The encoding/decoding model critique ==
Hall's encoding/decoding model has left its proponents with three main problems to solve. The first problem concerns polysemy. The three positions of decoding proposed by Hall are based on the audience's conscious awareness of the intended meanings encoded into the text. In other words, these positions – agreement, negotiation, opposition – are in relation to the intended meaning. However, polysemy means that the audience may create new meanings out of the text. The audience's perceived meanings may not be intended by the producers. Therefore, 'polysemy' and 'opposition' should be seen as two analytically distinct processes, although they do interconnect in the overall reading process. The second problem relates to aesthetics. TV viewers may take an aesthetically critical stance towards the text, commenting on the paradigmatic and syntagmatic aspects of textual production. Underlying this is the viewers' awareness of the 'constructedness' of the text, which is a different dimension from meaning making in the decoding process. The third problem addresses the positions of encoding. Hall's model does not differentiate the various positions media producers may take in relation to the dominant ideology. Instead, it assumes that encoding always takes place within a dominant-hegemonic position.

Ross suggests two ways to modify Hall's typology of the Encoding/Decoding Model by expanding the original version. While presenting the modified typology, Ross stresses that his suggested version does not imply to replace the original model but rather to expand it and to let the model work in a new way. Further is the explanation of one of the alternative models suggested by Ross, which is a more complex typology consisting of nine combinations of encoding and decoding positions (Figure 1 and Figure 2). The reasons why the original model needs to be revisited and the alternative model description to follow.

In line with previous scholarship criticizing Hall's model, Ross and Morley argue that the model has some unsolved problems. First, Morley mentions that in the decoding stage there is a need to distinguish comprehension of the text and its evaluation. Comprehension here refers to the reader's understanding of the text in the basic sense and the sender's intention, and to possible readers interpretations of the text (borrowed from Schroder). Evaluation is how readers relate the text to the ideological position (also borrowed from Schroder).

Second, Morley discusses the problem of understanding the concept of 'oppositional reading'. There might be confusion between referring 'oppositional reading' to rejecting the preferred meaning (dominant ideology) and to disagreement with the text. For example, imagine that an oppositional TV channel produced a news story about some flaws in the ObamaCare. According to the original model, a reader can fully share the text's code and accept its meaning, or reject it and bring an alternative frame of it. In the first case nevertheless a reader fully agrees with the text, s/he would be in opposition to the dominant ideology (we understand dominant ideology here as promoting government initiatives), while in the second case by disagreeing with the news story a reader would actually favor dominant ideology. That leads to the final problem of the original model -- assuming that all the media encode texts within the dominant ideology and thus suggesting that media is homogeneous in nature.

In order to address these problems, Ross suggests two steps in modifying the original model. The first step is to distinguish between the graphical model and the typology, which is different decoding positions (dominant-hegemonic, negotiated, and oppositional). The second step is to divide the model into two versions, an ideology version (Figure 1) and a text-related version (Figure 2).

Figure 1. The modified encoding/decoding typology (ideology version)

| | | ENCODING POSITIONS | | |
|---|---|---|---|---|
| | | Dominant-hegemonic encoding (Hall's assumed mode) | Negotiated Encoding (partly critical text) | Oppositional encoding (a radical text) |
| DECODING POSITIONS (ideological) | Dominant-hegemonic position | Dominant-hegemonic reading of dominant-hegemonic text | Dominant-hegemonic reading of negotiated text = Neutralization | Dominant-hegemonic reading of oppositional text = Neutralization |
| DECODING POSITIONS (ideological) | Negotiated position | Negotiated reading of dominant-hegemonic text | Negotiated reading of negotiated text | Negotiated reading of oppositional text |
| DECODING POSITIONS (ideological) | Oppositional position | Oppositional reading of dominant-hegemonic text | Oppositional reading of negotiated text = Amplification of critique | Oppositional reading of oppositional text = Agreement with oppositional text |

The main addition in both new typologies of Hall's model are two types of encoding meanings, which are a Negotiated position and an Oppositional position. As the original model makes all media institutions encode messages in the dominant-hegemonic manner, Ross takes a step further and 'allow' media institutions to encode texts according to the oppositional or negotiated framework. Thus, media texts in both Hall's versions can be dominant-hegemonic (Hall's assumed mode), partly critical or radical.

Another addition to the original model is the appearance of a Neutralization category meaning that media texts encoded within an oppositional or negotiated framework are decoded according to the dominant ideology. Let's look at the upper right corner of the Ross ideology version (Figure 1) at the cell when a radical text intersects with a dominant-hegemonic decoding position. For example, neutralization will happen if a TV news report conveying a message about an oppositional political party in Russia may be interpreted by a conservative viewer as an evidence of the US sponsorship of anti-government organizations underlying Russian independency. Let's now look at the lower right corner of the same version at the cell when a radical text is decoded by viewers within an oppositional position. In this case 'oppositional reading of oppositional text' needs explanation that it equals to the "agreement with oppositional text" as readers text evaluation might cause misunderstanding.

Figure 2. The modified encoding/decoding typology (text-relative version)

| | | ENCODING POSITIONS | | |
|---|---|---|---|---|
| | | Dominant-hegemonic encoding (Hall's assumed mode) | Negotiated Encoding (partly critical text) | Oppositional encoding (a radical text) |
| DECODING POSITIONS (text-relative) | Text-accepting position | Text-acceptance of dominant-hegemonic text | Text-acceptance of negotiated text | Text-acceptance of oppositional text |
| DECODING POSITIONS (text-relative) | Text-negotiation position | Negotiation of dominant-hegemonic text | Negotiation of negotiated text | Negotiation of oppositional text |
| DECODING POSITIONS (text-relative) | Text-oppositional position | Text-oppositional reading of dominant-hegemonic text | Text-oppositional reading of negotiated text | Text-oppositional reading of oppositional text = Neutralization |

In order to avoid misinterpretations and to make an alternative typology more reader-friendly, Ross suggests a text-relative version that stresses not the ideological tendency of the text, but rather if receivers are in agreement or opposition with any kind of text. In this version Ross changed the term 'dominant-hegemonic' to 'text-acceptance'; and the term 'oppositional' to 'text-oppositional' in order to remind readers the difference between opposition to the dominant ideology and opposition to the text.

In the text-relative version a Neutralization category moved to the lower right cell while saving its meaning. Neutralization means applying dominant ideology to the radical text or rejecting oppositional texts.

Wu and Bergman propose a revision to Hall's encoding/decoding model in a different way. They conceptualize the adoption of certain codes by producers and viewers respectively as encoding strategies and decoding strategies. For producers, encoding strategies are partly influenced by their imagination of how the audience will decode their products, which they conceptualize as the imagined decoding strategies. For viewers, their awareness of the 'constructedness' of the text means that from the text they also perceive, apart from its meaning, the encoding strategies, which are not necessarily the same strategies adopted by producers. These perceived encoding strategies constitute an important dimension of the decoding process. Based on their intended meanings and imagined decoding strategies, media producers execute certain encoding strategies and give a certain shape to the text. In the decoding process, viewers derive both perceived meanings and perceived encoding strategies from the text. From these two dimensions, viewers arrive at their evaluation of the text. This revised model admits the diversity of producers' ideological positions in the encoding process. Clearly separating perceived meanings from intended meanings, it anticipates the situation of polysemy. By distinguishing between perceived meanings and perceived encoding strategies, it also gives space to audience's awareness of the 'constructedness' of the text.

To conclude, while Hall's Encoding/Decoding model of communication is highly evaluated and widely used in research, it has been criticised as it contains some unsolved problems. This section discussed some flaws in the original model and introduced proposed revisions to Hall's typology.

== See also ==
- Aberrant decoding
- Semiotic democracy
- Reception theory
- Reader-response criticism
