= Charlotte Brunsdon =

British professor (born 1952)

Charlotte Brunsdon (born 1952) is a professor of film and television studies at the University of Warwick and researcher. She was one of the principal researchers of the Nationwide Project.

Brunsdon studied English at University College London and completed her Ph.D. at the Centre for Contemporary Cultural Studies Birmingham in the 1970s, where she and David Morley were the principal researchers for the Nationwide Project. Brunsdon's research is focused on television, film, and media audience research. She is a founding member of the Midlands Television Research Group, was the principal investigator on the Projection Project, and a Fellow of the British Academy.

== Research ==
Brunsdon's research interests focus on television and film and their connection to culture and feminism, as well as the effects media has on audiences. Her approach to researching and studying television and film focuses less on how it plays out on the screen and more about how it can be discussed and studied in academia.

She was one of the principal researchers in the Nationwide Project, a media audience research project conducted at the Centre for Contemporary Cultural Studies in the 1970s and 1980s. David Morley and Charlotte Brunsdon were its principal researchers. The project focused on media audiences to study the encoding and decoding model, which is a part of reception theory. The research focused on the difference between how certain audiences understand texts with an emphasis on British television, something Brunsdon and Morley call 'national-ness'.

Brunsdon, along with Jason Jacobs, Ann Gray, and Tim O’Sullivan founded the Midlands Television Research Group in the 1990s, to create a space for media scholars in the United Kingdom. The group continues to meets once a term to discuss television, the news, keep up to date about new work regarding film and television, discuss their individual projects, and work on collaborative projects. Group members included Ph.D. students and media scholars at the University of Warwick, De Montfort University, the University of Lincoln, Leeds Metropolitan University, the University of Hull, and the University of Central England. Group projects led by Brunson include "Factual entertainment on British television: The Midlands TV Research Group’s‘8–9 Project’" and "In Focus: The Place of Television Studies: A View from the British Midlands: Introduction".

Brunsdon was the Principal Investigator on the Projection Project from 2014-2018. In the Projection Project she served as the key point of contact for project management. In addition to this she worked with Dr. Richard Wallace in the planning and analysis of interviews. The Project researched the history of cinema projection in the United Kingdom after the switch to digital projection in most cinemas by using interviews, archives, feature films, and photographs. It focused on four areas: the modern transition to digital, the history of the cinema projectionists job, the projectionists in films themselves, and digital projection as a new form of art. The project ran from 2014-2018 and was funded by the Arts and Humanities Research Council (AHRC).

== Teaching and Supervision ==
Brunsdon has developed and taught a large array of courses regarding television and film studies at the University of Warwick and visiting semesters in the United States at Duke University and the University of Wisconsin–Madison. The classes she has taught include ‘The Cinema and the City’, ‘National Cinemas’ and ‘Film and Television Culture in Britain’. She has also supervised many Ph.D. theses on film and television.

== Selected publications ==
=== Books ===
- Brunsdon, C. (1997). Screen tastes: Soap opera to satellite dishes. Psychology Press.
- Brunsdon, C. (2000). The feminist, the housewife, and the soap opera. Oxford University Press, USA.
- Brunsdon, C., & Morley, D. (2005). The nationwide television studies. Routledge.
- Brunsdon, C. (2007). London in cinema: The cinematic city since 1945. British Film Institute.
- Brunsdon, C. (2017). Law and order. Springer.
- Brunsdon, C. (2018). Television Cities: Paris, London, Baltimore. Duke University Press.

=== Journal articles ===
- Brunsdon, C. (1993). Identity in feminist television criticism. Media, Culture & Society, 15(2), 309-320.
- Brunsdon, C. (2008). Is television studies history?. Cinema Journal, 47(3), 127-137.
- Brunsdon, C. (2012). The attractions of the cinematic city. Screen, 53(3), 209-227.
