= Aberrant decoding =

Unintended misinterpretation of messages

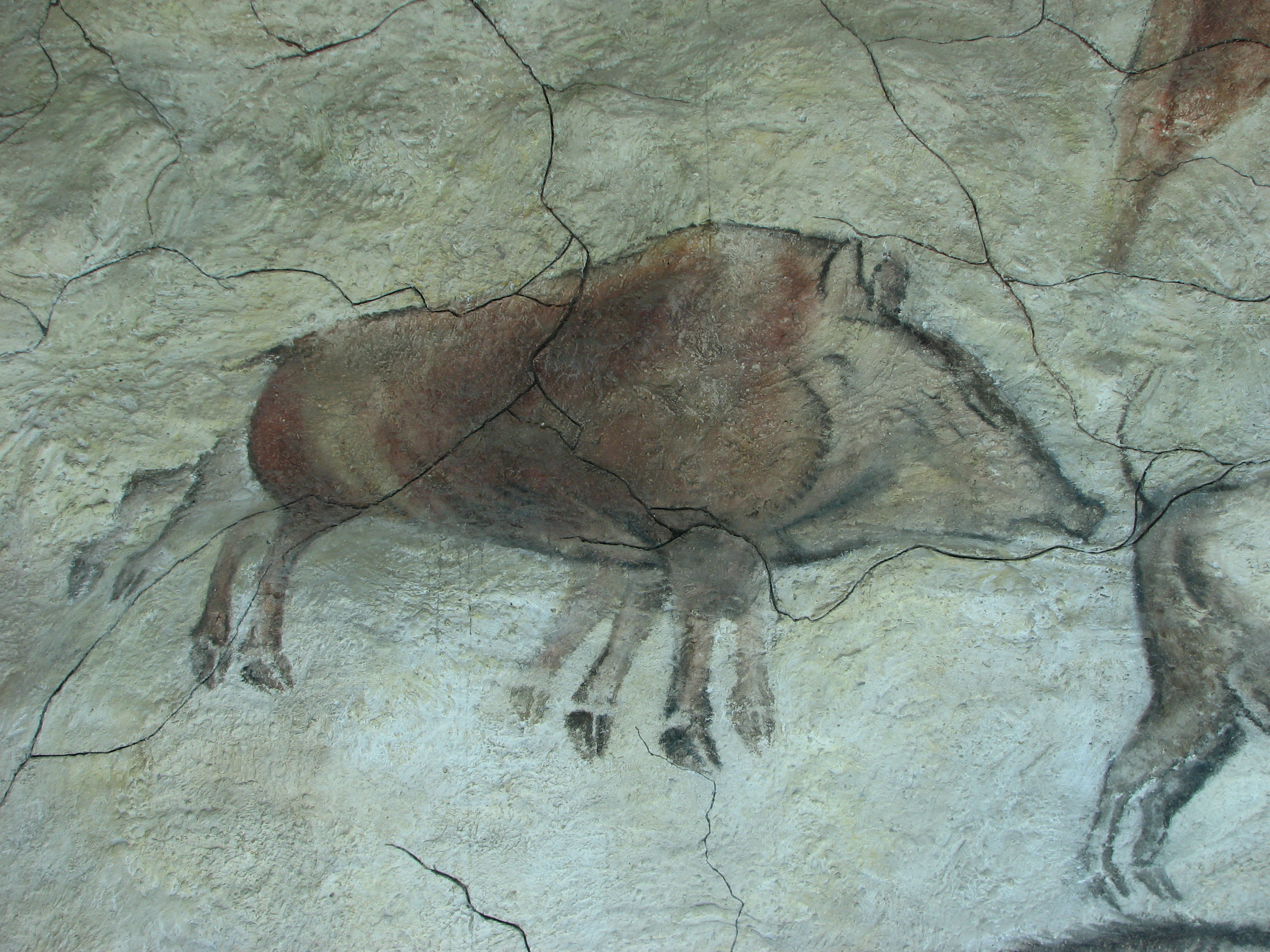
A living trotting boar, or a dead boar lying on its side? Cave painting from Altamira.

Aberrant decoding or aberrant reading is a concept used in fields such as communication and media studies, semiotics, and journalism about how messages can be interpreted differently from what was intended by their sender. The concept was proposed by Umberto Eco in an article published first in 1965 in Italian and in 1972 in English.

== Concept ==
Every communication act requires that the messages must be encoded into a set of signs by the sender. These signs must then be transmitted and decoded by the receiver to understand the contained messages. The code system must be shared by both the sender and the receiver in order for the communication to succeed. For example, thoughts must be encoded into words, transmitted through air, and then be decoded back to thoughts. Often the sender has a certain meaning to convey with his message, hoping the receiver will interpret it correctly. This right interpretation can be called the preferred decoding or preferred reading. When the interpretation of the message is different from what was intended, this can be called aberrant decoding. Aberrant decodings can occur in a more widespread range of situations, as wrong interpretation of a media product or text whose incoming message is not the one intended by the creator of the product or text.

According to Eco, aberrant decodings were rare in pre-industrial societies, when most communication occurred between people who shared the same culture. He lists four classes of exceptions where aberrant decodings could have happened:

- People who did not share the same language.
- People trying to interpret the meanings of past cultures. For example, Medieval people looking at Roman art.
- People who did not share the same belief system. For example, Christians looking at pagan art.
- People who came from different cultures. For example, white Europeans looking at Aboriginal art.

Eco continues that in contemporary media, instead of being exceptions, aberrant decodings have become the norm. For example, TV broadcasters know beforehand that their messages will be interpreted in various ways. He speculated that because of this freedom of interpretation, the power of media over individuals might be much less influential than is thought.

This idea of examining the messages contained in the media and how the audience interprets them has since become one of the core concepts of academic media research. Eco's article influenced, among others, Stuart Hall's encoding/decoding theory.

John Fiske has argued that aberrant decoding occurs mainly with iconic codes, referring to visual messages. (Note: Iconic codes or iconic signs in semiotics and communication theory could also refer to a class of signs defined by iconicity (as in Peirce's triadic sign theory). But in this case Fiske contrasts iconic signs with "verbal language" (p. 78).) As an example, he explains how prehistoric cave paintings of animals are often seen as graceful and moving. However, in 1960, Margaret Abercrombie claimed that the paintings are, in fact, depictions of dead animals. Thus, if we accept Abercrombie's claim, we can argue that our modern culture, where we value living animals and only rarely encounter dead ones, has led us to aberrant decoding of the paintings.

== See also ==
- Authorial intent
- Context (language use)
- Death of the Author
- Decode (semiotics)
- Encode (semiotics)
- Encoding/decoding model of communication
- Objective correlative
- Opaque context
- Polysemy
- Reader-response criticism
- Reception theory
