= The Nationwide Project =

Media audience research project

The Nationwide Project was an influential media audience research project conducted by the Centre for Contemporary Cultural Studies at the University of Birmingham, England, in the late 1970s and early 1980s. Its principal researchers were David Morley and Charlotte Brunsdon.

== Initial stage ==
The Media Group at the CCCS selected the BBC television current affairs programme Nationwide to study the encoding/decoding model, a part of reception theory, developed by Stuart Hall. This study was concerned with "the programme's distinctive ideological themes and with the particular ways in which Nationwide addressed the viewer". This first part of the study was published by Brunsdon and Morley in 1978.

== Stage two ==
Morley conducted qualitative research with various participants from different educational and occupational backgrounds. He observed different responses to a clip of its budget special to see whether they would construct dominant, oppositional or negotiated readings (the three categories of readings proposed by Hall).

Management groups produced dominant readings, while teacher training students and university arts students produced negotiated readings. Trade union groups characteristically produced oppositional or negotiated readings. Black college students, however, "fail[ed] to engage with the discourse of the programme enough to reconstruct or redefine it".

The initial conclusion was that decodings cannot be traced solely to socioeconomic position, since members of the sample occupying the same class location produced different readings. However, Sujeong Kim's statistical re-analysis of the project's findings suggests that this may be an underinterpretation: according to Kim, the results show that 'audience's social positions ... structure their understandings and evaluations of television programmes in quite consistent directions and patterns.' For example, Kim observes that middle class viewers produced negotiated readings of one particular programme, while working class viewers produced dominant or oppositional readings dependent on their gender and race.
