= Heterosemy =

Concept in linguistics

Heterosemy is a concept in linguistics. A word is heterosemous if it has two or more meanings or functions that are historically related, but belong to different morphosyntactic categories (parts of speech). An example is the English word peel: peel functions as a noun in the expression I threw the orange peel in the bin, but as a verb in Would you peel the orange for me?. Heterosemy can be seen as a special case of homonymy.

Heterosemy contrasts with polysemy: while heterosemy implies two distinct words with the same form, polysemy implies one word with multiple meanings. For example, the word hard has the related meanings "solid" (as in a hard surface) and "difficult" (as in a hard question), but since the word is used as an adjective in both cases, it is an instance of polysemy. On the other hand, the two uses of peel are associated with two different lexemes, one being a noun and the other a verb. Linguists have been unwilling to apply the label polysemy to such cases, since polysemy is traditionally considered to be a relation between different uses of the same lexeme, and thus not applicable to words belonging to different categories.

The term heterosemy was first introduced by Gunnar Persson, but is usually associated with the work of Frantisek Lichtenberk.
