= Influence and reception of Søren Kierkegaard =

Impact of Danish theologian and philosopher

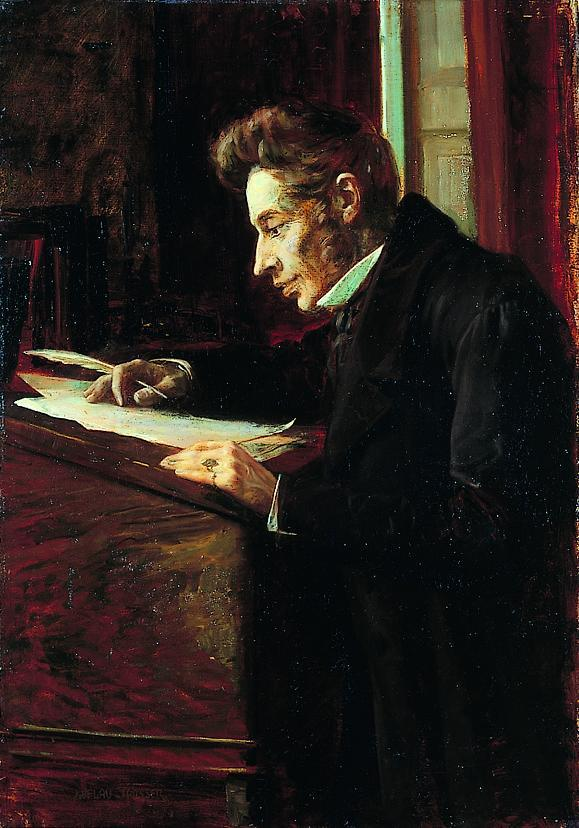
1902 oil painting of Kierkegaard, by Luplau Janssen.

Søren Kierkegaard was a Danish philosopher whose influence and reception varied widely and may be roughly divided into various chronological periods. Reactions were anything but uniform, and proponents of various ideologies attempted to appropriate his work quite early.

Kierkegaard's reputation as a philosopher was first established in his native Denmark with his work Either/Or. Henriette Wulff, in a letter to Hans Christian Andersen, wrote, "Recently a book was published here with the title Either/Or! It is supposed to be quite strange, the first part full of Don Juanism, skepticism, et cetera, and the second part toned down and conciliating, ending with a sermon that is said to be quite excellent. The whole book attracted much attention. It has not yet been discussed publicly by anyone, but it surely will be. It is actually supposed to be by a Kierkegaard who has adopted a pseudonym...."

Kierkegaard's fame in Denmark increased with each publication of his philosophical works, including Fear and Trembling and Philosophical Fragments, and culminating in his magnum opus, the Concluding Unscientific Postscript to Philosophical Fragments. However, Kierkegaard's attack upon Christendom, represented by the Danish National Church near the end of his life, did not endear him to many in the clergy and theological circles. After his death, his original manuscripts were bequeathed by his one-time fiancée, Regine Olsen for posterity. She later donated most of his writings to the Danish Royal Library where they continue to be stored.

Kierkegaard's thought gained a wider audience with the translation of his works into German, French, and English.

== Kierkegaard and philosophy and theology ==
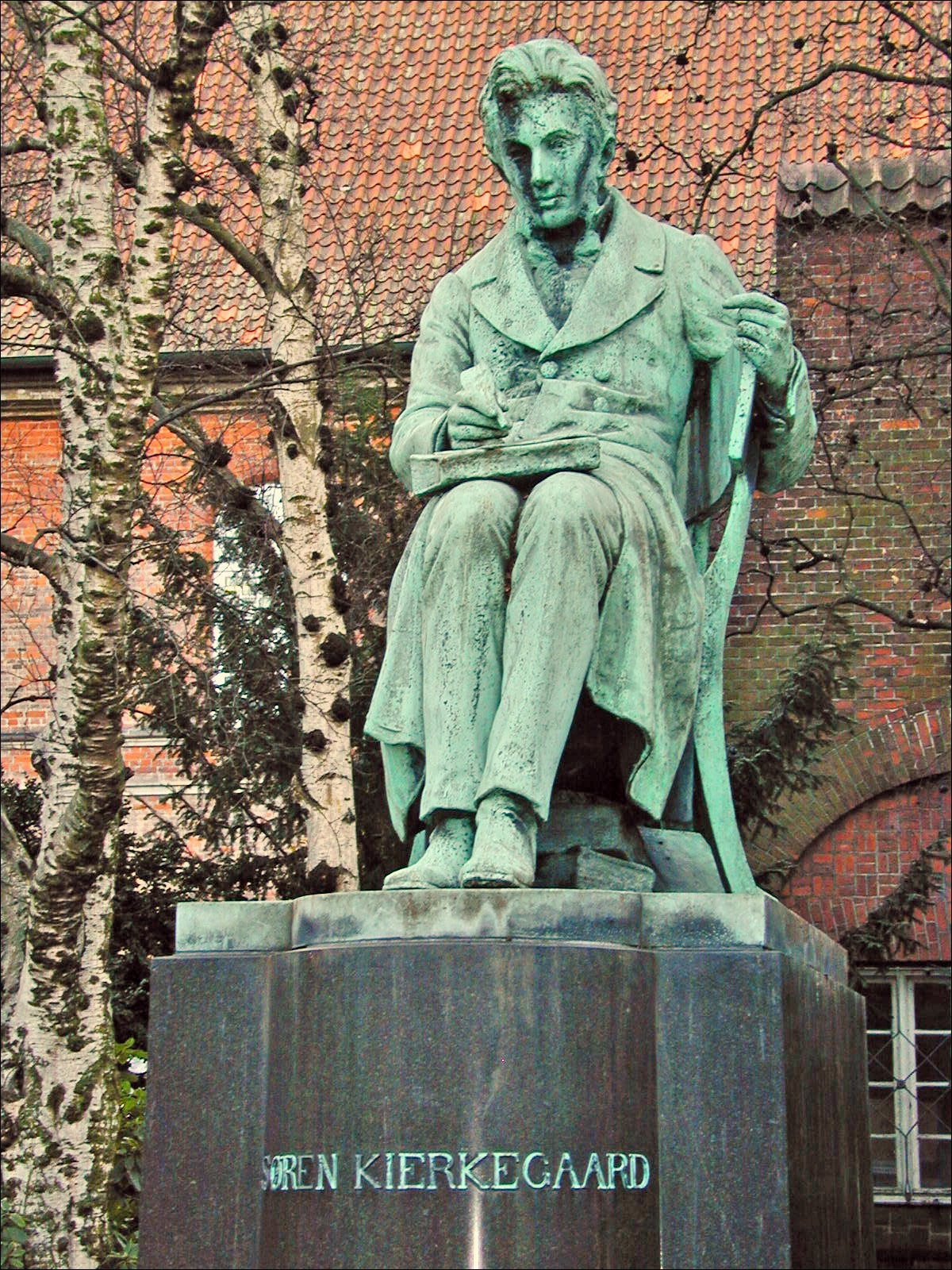
The Søren Kierkegaard Statue in the Royal Library Garden in Copenhagen

Many 20th-century philosophers, both theistic and atheistic, drew concepts from Kierkegaard, including the notions of angst, despair, and the importance of the individual. His fame as a philosopher grew tremendously in the 1930s, in large part because the ascendant existentialist movement pointed to him as a precursor, although later writers celebrated him as a highly significant and influential thinker in his own right. Since Kierkegaard was raised as a Lutheran, he was commemorated as a teacher in the Calendar of Saints of the Lutheran Church on 11 November and in the Calendar of Saints of the Episcopal Church with a feast day on 8 September.

Philosophers and theologians influenced by Kierkegaard include Hans Urs von Balthasar, Karl Barth, Simone de Beauvoir, Niels Bohr, Dietrich Bonhoeffer, Emil Brunner, Martin Buber, Rudolf Bultmann, Albert Camus, Martin Heidegger, Abraham Joshua Heschel, Karl Jaspers, Gabriel Marcel, Maurice Merleau-Ponty, Reinhold Niebuhr, Franz Rosenzweig, Jean-Paul Sartre, Gilles Deleuze, Joseph Soloveitchik, Paul Tillich, Malcolm Muggeridge, Thomas Merton, Miguel de Unamuno. Paul Feyerabend's epistemological anarchism in the philosophy of science was inspired by Kierkegaard's idea of subjectivity as truth. Ludwig Wittgenstein was immensely influenced and humbled by Kierkegaard, claiming that "Kierkegaard is far too deep for me, anyhow. He bewilders me without working the good effects which he would in deeper souls". Karl Popper referred to Kierkegaard as "the great reformer of Christian ethics, who exposed the official Christian morality of his day as anti-Christian and anti-humanitarian hypocrisy".

== Kierkegaard and psychology ==
Kierkegaard had a profound influence on psychology. He is widely regarded as the founder of Christian psychology and of existential psychology and therapy. Existentialist (often called "humanistic") psychologists and therapists include Ludwig Binswanger, Viktor Frankl, Erich Fromm, Carl Rogers, and Rollo May. May based his The Meaning of Anxiety on Kierkegaard's The Concept of Anxiety. Kierkegaard's sociological work Two Ages: The Age of Revolution and the Present Age critiques modernity. Ernest Becker based his 1974 Pulitzer Prize book, The Denial of Death, on the writings of Kierkegaard, Freud and Otto Rank. Kierkegaard is also seen as an important precursor of postmodernism.

== Kierkegaard and literature ==
Kierkegaard influenced 19th-century literature writers as well as 20th-century literature. August Strindberg (1843-1912) found inspiration in Kierkegaard and the famous Norwegian dramatist and poet Henrik Ibsen (1828-1906) clearly seems to have been inspired by the Dane in famous works such as Brand. The other great Norwegian national writer and poet Bjornstjerne Bjornson (1832-1910) was also deeply inspired by Kierkegaard. Finally the celebrated Norwegian artist Edvard Munch (1863-1944) closely studied key concepts such as anxiety, and this influence is notable in some of his iconic paintings such as The Scream.

Other figures deeply influenced by his work include W. H. Auden, Jorge Luis Borges, Don DeLillo, Hermann Hesse, Franz Kafka, David Lodge, Flannery O'Connor, Walker Percy, Rainer Maria Rilke, J.D. Salinger and John Updike. Kierkegaard's work The Diary of a Seducer has been re-published several times, including Princeton University Press' translation with John Updike's foreword and Penguin Books' series Great Loves.

== Kierkegaard after World War I ==
Kierkegaard's present stature in the English-speaking world owes much to the exegetical writings and improved Kierkegaard translations by the American theologian Walter Lowrie, the University of Minnesota philosopher David F. Swenson, and the Danish translators Howard and Edna Hong. Anthony Rudd's book Kierkegaard and the Limits of the Ethical and Alasdair MacIntyre's discussion of Kierkegaard in After Virtue and A Short History of Ethics did much to facilitate Kierkegaard's legacy in ethical thought in analytic philosophy.

Kierkegaard's influence on continental philosophy increased dramatically after the First and Second World Wars, especially among the German existenz thinkers and French existentialists. Jean-Paul Sartre, Emmanuel Levinas, and Karl Barth all owe a heavy debt to Kierkegaard. Paul Ricoeur and Judith Butler wrote monographs drawing new attention to Kierkegaard's work, and a 1964 UNESCO colloquium on Kierkegaard in Paris ranks as one of the most important events for a generation's reception of Kierkegaard, which included a keynote speaker, Sartre who gave his lecture The Singular Universal, which solidified Kierkegaard's influence over existentialism. In America, interest in Kierkegaard was revived from the 1980s onwards, particularly by the American philosopher and curator of the Kierkegaard Library at St. Olaf College Gordon Marino, who has devoted several books and essays to Kierkegaard. In Kierkegaard's native Denmark, the Danish people hosted his 200th anniversary of Kierkegaard's birth in Copenhagen in May 2013.

Kierkegaard has also influenced members of the analytical philosophy tradition, most notably Ludwig Wittgenstein, who considered Kierkegaard to be "the most profound thinker of the [nineteenth] century. Kierkegaard was a saint." To some degree, Kierkegaard can be seen as one of the few philosophers to whom the simple analytic/continental divide does not fully apply.

Kierkegaard predicted his posthumous fame, and foresaw that his work would become the subject of intense study and research. In his journals, he wrote:

"What the age needs is not a genius—it has had geniuses enough, but a martyr, who in order to teach men to obey would himself be obedient unto death. What the age needs is awakening. And therefore someday, not only my writings but my whole life, all the intriguing mystery of the machine will be studied and studied. I never forget how God helps me and it is therefore my last wish that everything may be to his honour."

== Kierkegaard and feminism ==
Kierkegaard's relationship to feminism is complex and has been the subject of differing interpretations. He has been described as misogynistic, making "snide comments about woman’s nature, mocking with utmost irony her “great abilities” and sneering at the possibility of her emancipation" although Dera Sipe of Villanova University states that viewing Kierkegaard as a "straight misogynist is highly problematic". In her paper Kierkegaard and Feminism: A Paradoxical Friendship, Sipe commends Kierkegaard for taking "a hammer to the cold foundations of traditional Western philosophy" and introducing existentialism which feminism has adopted and thrived in. She then states that due to Kierkegaard's rampant use of Pseudonyms one must separate Kierkegaard from his Pseudonyms. (Note: Or as they're described in the paper as "players in a drama" with Kierkegaard as the director.) Sipe argues that it "would be of more benefit to feminism not to read Kierkegaard in search of his own personal stance on the woman question, but rather to read him in an exploratory manner as one who has exposed new avenues of thought, new ways of examining the woman question". Sipe, after examining his essay on the suffragette movement and the seducer's diary and their misogynistic content, then pivots towards Kierkegaard's view on the Virgin Mary, mother of Jesus, the young daughter of Raguel and Edna both of whom Kierkegaard considers to be knights of faith. She states that from these examples it is clear that Kierkegaard (or at least Johannes de Silentio) did hold great respect for women.

== International reception ==
=== In France ===
Kierkegaard was first mentioned in a French publication in 1856 in Revue des deux mondes (English: Review of the Two Worlds) in an article detailing the state of Danish politics and culture which described his influence on the Danish church as having "bewildered many minds and troubled many weak or fearful consciences". The article also detailed the controversy around his funeral.

The first translation of Kierkegaard into French was published in 1886 by Johannes Gøtzsche, with a preface by the theologian Hans-Peter Kofoed-Hansen. The work translated was Two Minor Ethical-Religious Essays (French: En quoi l'homme de génie diffère-t-il de l'apôtre? Traité éthique-religieux).

Subsequent translations of Kierkegaard into French include those produced by Paul Petit, who produced a French translation of the Concluding Unscientific Postscript in 1941, as well as a translation of the Philosophical Fragments, published posthumously in 1947.

=== In Germany ===
The earliest mentions of Kierkegaard's work in German publications were written by Andreas Frederik Beck, himself Danish and one of the attendees at Kierkegaard's oral dissertation defence. There was an anonymous German review of Philosophical Fragments published in 1845 which subsequent scholarship believes was written by Beck. Kierkegaard responded to Beck's criticisms in a footnote published in the followup to the Fragments, the Concluding Unscientific Postscript. Another early mention of Kierkegaard in German is from Johann Georg Theodor Grässe, who included Kierkegaard briefly in an 1848 review of European literature.

In 1856, the Bavarian-born conservative politician and historian Joseph Edmund Jörg wrote an article discussing religious movements and events in Scandinavian history. The Catholic Jörg praised Kierkegaard's relentless attack on the Danish Lutheran Church, but suggests that Kierkegaard should perhaps have seen Catholicism as a final step in his religious development.

Early translations of Kierkegaard into German were restricted to his post-1850 material (The Moment, the attack on the Lutheran Church) and appeared in the 1860s. The Tübingen-trained pastor, Albert Bärthold, studied Kierkegaard under Johann Tobias Beck and published translations of a number of Kierkegaard's works.

Hjalmar Hjorth Boyesen (1848-1895) recognized Georg Brandes article on Soren Kierkegaard, as well as The Corsair in his March, 1888 article Scandinavian Literature in The Chautauquan. He notes that both Either/Or and Stages on the Path of Life had already been translated into German by that time.

The most significant translation work was conducted by Christoph Schrempf, another student of J.T. Beck. Schrempf's first translations appeared in 1890 and by 1922, he had completed translations of the entire set of Kierkegaard's published writings. His translations have been criticised repeatedly as unreliable: Heiko Schulz referred to them as "repeatedly revised, highly idiosyncratic, and at times breathtakingly free renditions of the Kierkegaardian texts". Schrempf also spread a view of Kierkegaard significantly out-of-step from the mainstream, interpreting Kierkegaard's "subjectivity as truth" as a justification for his own religious disbelief.

=== In the English-Speaking World ===
The first translation of Kierkegaard's work into English was in 1908 when a translation into English of selections from his writing appeared. More extensive translations of his work into English began in the late 1930s, with translations of various works by Alexander Dru, Walter Lowrie, and David Swenson.

== Sources ==
- Creegan, Charles (1989). "Wittgenstein and Kierkegaard". Routledge. Archived from the original on 22 August 2010.
- Dru, Alexander (1938). The Journals of Søren Kierkegaard. Oxford: Oxford University Press.
- Hampson, Daphne (2001). Christian Contradictions: The Structures of Lutheran and Catholic Thought. Cambridge. ISBN 9780521604352.
- Kierkegaard, Søren (2001). A Literary Review. London: Penguin Classics. ISBN 0140448012.
- McGee, Kyle. "Fear and Trembling in the Penal Colony". Kafka Project.
- Matustik, Martin Joseph; Westphal, Merold, eds. (1995). Kierkegaard in Post/Modernity. Bloomington: Indiana University Press. ISBN 0253209676.
- Ostenfeld, Ib; McKinnon, Alastair (1972). Søren Kierkegaard's Psychology. Waterloo: Wilfrid Laurer University Press. ISBN 0889200688.
- Popper, Sir Karl R (2002). The Open Society and Its Enemies Vol 2: Hegel and Marx. London: Routledge. ISBN 0-415-29063-5.
- Updike, John (1997). "Foreword". The Seducer's Diary by Søren Kierkegaard. Princeton: Princeton University Press. ISBN 0691017379.
- Weston, Michael (1994). Kierkegaard and Modern Continental Philosophy. London: Routledge. ISBN 0-415-10120-4.
