= Immenstadt =

- Town
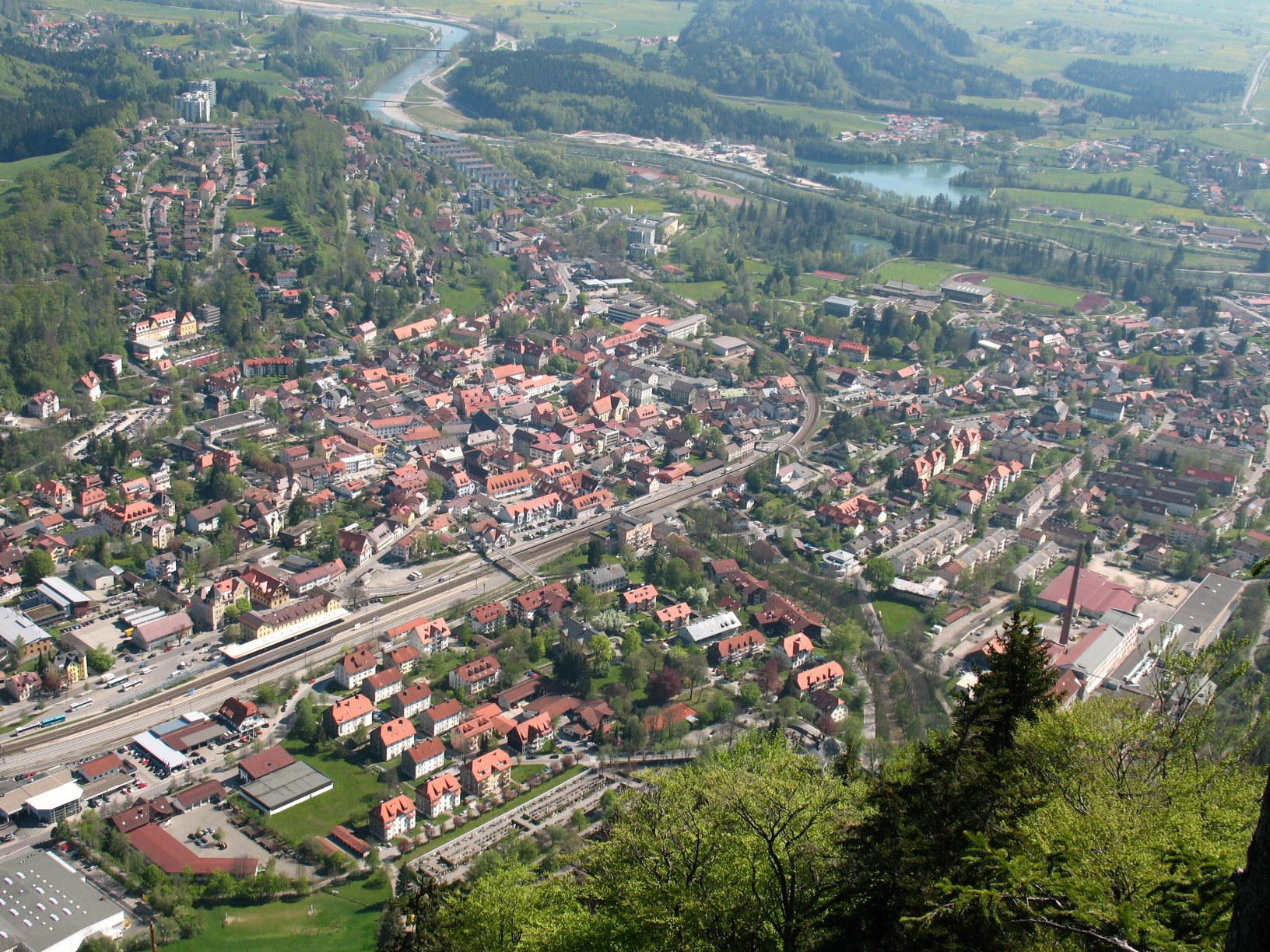
- Immenstadt

- Coat of arms

- Location of Immenstadt within Oberallgäu district
- Interactive map of Immenstadt
- Location within Germany Location within Bavaria
- Coordinates: 47°34′N 10°13′E
- Country: Germany
- State: Bavaria
- Admin. region: Schwaben
- District: Oberallgäu

Government
  - Mayor (2020–26): Nico Sentner

Area
  - Total: 81.44 km^{2} (31.44 sq mi)
- Elevation: 728–1,749 m (2,388–5,738 ft)

Population (2025-12-31)
  - Total: 14,237
  - Density: 174.8/km^{2} (452.8/sq mi)
- Time zone: UTC+01:00 (CET)
  - Summer (DST): UTC+02:00 (CEST)
- Postal codes: 87509
- Dialling codes: 08323
- Vehicle registration: OA
- Website: www.stadt-immenstadt.de

Immenstadt im Allgäu (German pronunciation: [ˈɪmənʃtat ʔɪm ˈʔalɡɔʏ], lit. 'Immenstadt in the Allgäu') is a town in Oberallgäu, the southernmost district of Bavaria, Germany, in the German Alps. First mentioned in a 1275 administrative tract, it was granted town privileges in 1360, which makes it one of the oldest towns in the area. It was the seat of the counts of Königsegg-Rothenfels until 1804.

== History ==
While historians suspect the area to have been settled as early as the Neolithic period, nothing is known of the origins of the modern-era town. The oldest datable source is a 1275 administrative tract compiled by the diocese of Konstanz. Immendorf was granted town (Stadt) privileges by the emperor Charles IV. in 1360, thus changing its name to Immenstadt, with an estimated population of 135.

Immenstadt was affected by the German Peasants' War of 1525 and lost almost 70 per cent of its population to the plague during the Thirty Years' War (1618–1648). During the sixteenth and seventeenth centuries, however, the town also gained economic wealth through the salt and linen trade, and it became the seat of the counts of Königsegg-Rothenfels in 1664.

The counts were deposed during the French Revolutionary Wars, and Immenstadt briefly became Austrian before joining Bavaria in 1805. After major town fires in 1805 and 1844, Immenstadt entered the modern era in the 1850s, when the railroad arrived and the town's first factory opened shortly afterward. Immenstadt became a garrison town in the First World War and was bombed once in the Second World War, which cost six lives and destroyed several buildings along the railroad tracks. The town has enjoyed quiet prosperity since, with the exception of a flooding of parts of the municipal territory in 1999. The administrative reform of 1972 resulted in the incorporation of six nearby villages.

== Town Life ==
Located at the Northern edge of the German Alps, Immenstadt has long been a tourist destination. Visitors are drawn to the nearby mountains for hiking and skiing, and to the Alpsee lakes for swimming and boating. The town hosts a major triathlon event in July of each year. Its local history museum, Hofmühle, resides in a former mill building. A second museum, the Mountain Farmers Museum, is located in the nearby village of Diepolz.

A number of historical buildings can be found in the town center, including the town hall, the St. Josef church, and the town castle of the counts of Königsegg-Rothenfels, all of which date from the seventeenth century. Sculptures across the town center commemorate historical trades, especially brewing and mountain farming. Notable historical sites in the municipal area include the Maria Loreto pilgrims' chapel and the ruins of the Rothenfels, Hugofels, Laubenberg, and Werdenstein castles.

Among the important annual events in town life are the town festival and the Allgäu Triathlon in July, the Cheese and Farmers Market in late summer, and the Viehscheid (return of the cattle from the mountains) in September. The town hosts a series of open-air events on its central square, the Marienplatz, during the summer.

Immenstadt has a number of schools, including a gymnasium and the district's vocational school. It is the seat of the district newspaper, Allgäuer Zeitung and of a Bosch factory that is also the town's biggest employer.

== Mayors since 1900 ==
- Georg Burghardt (1900–1911)
- Friedrich Kraus (1912–1914)
- Dr. Hermann Stenger (1916–1935)
- Matthäus Fehr (1935–1942)
- Otto Fäßler (1945)
- Georg Sigel (1945)
- Albert Wehr (1945–1946)
- Alfred Frey (1946)
- Dr. Karl Huber (1947–1952)
- Karl Pfau (1952–1970)
- Hubert Rabini (1970–1978)
- Gerd Bischoff (1978–2008)
- Armin Schaupp (2008–2020)
- Nico Sentner (2020– )

== Twin cities ==
- Wellington, United Kingdom
- Lillebonne, France

== Notable people ==
- Dennis Endras (1985-), hockey goaltender
- Karin Ertl (1974-), German heptathlete
- Ludwig Glötzle (1847-1929), painter
- Joseph Edmund Jörg (1819-1901), historian and politician
- Thomas Jörg (1981-), professional ice hockey player
- Heini Klopfer (1916-1968), architect and ski jumper
- Klaus Nomi (1944-1983), pop and opera singer
- Alois Schmid (1854-1911), local historian and politician
- Christian Wagner (1959-), film director
- Uwe Wegmann (1964-), soccer player and coach
