= Predicate transfer =

In linguistics, predicate transfer is the reassignment of a property to an object which would not otherwise inherently have that property. Thus, the expression "I am parked out back" conveys the meaning of "parked" from "car" to the property of "I possess a car". This avoids incorrect polysemous interpretations of "parked": that "people can be parked", or that "I am pretending to be a car", or that "I am something which can be parked". This is supported by the morphology: "We are parked out back" does not mean that there are multiple cars; rather, that there are multiple passengers (having the property of being in possession of a car).
