= Decoding (semiotics) =

Decoding, in semiotics, is the process of interpreting a message sent by an addresser (sender) to an addressee (receiver). The complementary process – creating a message for transmission to an addressee – is called encoding.

== Overview ==
All communication depends on the use of codes. More traditional communication models always include three main elements: a sender, a transmitter, and a receiver (Fawkes 21). The sender is responsible for “encoding” (i.e., selecting information) their message and putting it through a transmitter (i.e., a communication channel or a medium like a video, radio, text messaging, etc.) (Fawkes 21). When the encoded information, put through the transmitter, gets to the receiver, it is the responsibility of the receiver to “decode” (i.e., interpret the message) and respond accordingly with feedback (Fawkes 21).

The communication process cannot work without all its three major parts: the sender/encoder, the transmitter/medium, and the receiver/decoder. If there is no sender/encoder, then nobody crafts the beginning message(s) to send out. If there is no medium/transmitter to put the message through, then the message cannot be delivered to the receiver. If there is no receiver/decoder then a message can’t be decoded and hold any value whatsoever (Eadie and Goret 29). When there is no value to a message the decoder cannot make meaning out of it (Eadie and Goret 29).

When the message is received, the addressee is not passive, but decoding is more than simply recognizing the content of the message. Over time, each individual in the audience develops a cognitive framework of codes that will recall the denotative meaning and suggest possible connotative meanings for each signifier. But the actual meaning for each message is context-dependent: the codified relations between the signifiers in the particular context must be interpreted according to the syntactic, semantic, and social codes so that the most appropriate meaning is attributed.

Away from the communication process itself, decoding has become so second nature in the lives of individuals to the point where we do not even realize we are decoding. When driving, for example, we are using the color of the traffic lights (an encoded nonverbal signal, in this case) as the basis of the encoded messages which we interpret. A green light is an encoded signal telling us (the receivers/decoders) to go ahead. Here, it is the context-dependent meaning – according to universally agreed-upon social codes of road rules – where we appropriately attach meaning to the colors of traffic lights. Overall, these encoded messages, supported by social codes and other factors, “function like dictionaries or look-up tables” for individuals in society (Chandler 178).

== Misinterpretations in decoding messages ==
Although the addresser may have a very clearly defined intention when encoding and wish to manipulate the audience into accepting the preferred meaning, the reality is not that of textual determinism.

What is decoded does not follow inevitably from an interpretation of the message. Roman Jakobson suggests that in the process of sending and receiving messages, “[d]ecoding involves moving from symbol to referent to experience as the constitution of meaning” (Lanigan 73). Not infrequently, the addressees find different levels of meaning. Addressees, or the receivers, decode according to their cultural signs because it is semiotics that often entails “the decoding of cultural signs” (Tiefenbrun 528). When decoding, the receiver must be the one to find the balance between a signifier and a signified (Tiefenbrun 196). In finding a balance, however, receivers engage in an “analytical quest” that may result in them inferring a completely unintended meaning that the encoder/sender did not intend (Tiefenbrun 195). This could be because of the receiver’s cultural background, previous knowledge, or perhaps another reason.

Umberto Eco called this mismatch between the intended meaning and interpreted meaning aberrant decoding. This apparent failure of communication may result for a variety of reasons, including 1) because the parties may use different codes due to their social class, 2) because the parties have different training or ability due to different world views or ideologies, or 3) because the parties are from different cultures. David Morley argues that the outcome of decoding will be influenced by pragmatic issues, i.e. whether:

- the addressee can comprehend the message in its entirety;
- the message is relevant to the addressee;
- the addressee is enjoying the experience of receiving the message; and
- the addressee accepts or rejects the addresser's values.

Further, Umberto Eco suggests a distinction between closed texts which predispose a dominant interpretation and more open texts which may have latent meanings or be encoded in a way that encourages the possibility of alternative interpretations.

== Symmetry and the two dominant positions ==
Signs are known to have some sort of balance in them—known as symmetry (Meagher 185). When there is symmetry in the communication process - symmetry between encoding and decoding - it can be placed in the field of “meaningful media signs” (Meagher 185). Within this view, there are two dominant positions that one can take: there is the most symmetrical position (called the dominant hegemonic position) and there is the least symmetrical position (called the oppositional position) (Meagher 185).

In the dominant hegemonic position (the most symmetrical position), “the viewer interprets the media sign according to the same logic used by encoder-producers” (Meagher 185). For example, if you are a recreational hockey player living in Canada and see a commercial from a Canadian company (the sender/encoder in this situation) for their new line of “ultra flex” hockey sticks, you (the receiver/decoder) will already understand the main benefits of the hockey sticks because you play hockey. In this example, you (the decoder) have something in common with the Canadian company that produced the commercial (the encoder), which allows you to share the same logic used by the Canadian company. When the receiver/decoder interprets the sign using the same logic as the encoder, it can be called a “preferred reading” (Meagher 185).

In the oppositional position (the least symmetrical decoding position), “the viewer recognizes the preferred reading that has been constructed by producers, but rejects it in its totality” (Meagher 185). Back to the example with hockey sticks, let’s say you – a recreational hockey player – understood the main benefits of the commercial for the new line hockey sticks, but reject the idea that it is an “ultra flex” stick because of the price and the image of the stick. Here, you still share the same logic as the encoder and still understand the commercial, but you reject it because of its look and price. This is the oppositional position. Note that most times the oppositional position occurs because the decoder sees the message as either deceptive or as a misrepresentation of the real world (Meagher 185).

== Semiotics in the world of advertising ==
Essentially, Semiotics works to understand how signs can be interpreted in various forms, one of which can be accomplished through Advertising. Since advertising works to persuading buyers to purchase goods and services, ads can display various messages (Zakia, Nadin 6). These advertisements often contain messages through images and words that help consumers interpret these symbols and signs (Zakia, Nadin 6). Therefore, this is how semiotics applies through advertising in simple terms. The use of semiotics as a method of advertising and marketing can be classified based on how the messages within the advertisements can answer three questions, who is the target audience, what is the purpose of the product, what is the product (Zakia, Nadin 6).

For example, when analyzing tobacco advertisements, specifically Marlboro and Virginia Slims, they target two very different demographics (Anderson et al. 256). Marlboro targets a male audience that symbolizes “rugged, masculine, independent, and heroic overtones,” whereas Virginia Slims’s target audience is women that convey “women’s liberation, femininity, and glamour” (Anderson et al. 256). These two examples display and answer who is the target audience? Which depends on the demographic. What is the purpose of the product? To sell cigarettes to their target audience, and what is the product? Which is the product of tobacco.

== How the interpretation of law uses semiotics ==
When looking at law itself, it is a composite form where there are individual norms that are formed together to create a whole. Texts incorporate the structural features of the signifiers with which they are built, but they are not conceptually identical to their signifiers as a whole.

According to Sebeok and Danesi, a coherent modelling system can be used to describe law.In traditional semiotic theory, a code is a system that provides specific types of signifiers that can be employed in a variety of ways and for a variety of representational goals.

In terms of semiotics, a lawyer's attempt to grasp the signs of the code, to explain the law, is called a decoding process, i.e., a method that is supplied to solve problems created by deviations (shifts in meaning) and questions about intents that are buried in the code.

== The legal system: the semiotic mesh model ==
From a semiotic-legal perspective, the legal system is a web of legally significant texts and meanings. To state that the legal system follows a Semiotic Mesh Model is to say that legal documents are connected to one another in some way, whether through syntactic, semantic, or pragmatic exchanges between legal actors. It's critical to stress, as Swiss jurist Pierre Moor emphasises, that the set of texts is always mobilised by the actions of legal players, making the community of legal actors responsible for the legal system's continual activity. Semioticist Bernard Jackson points out that legal language is a medium of communication for a specialised set of people known as jurists.

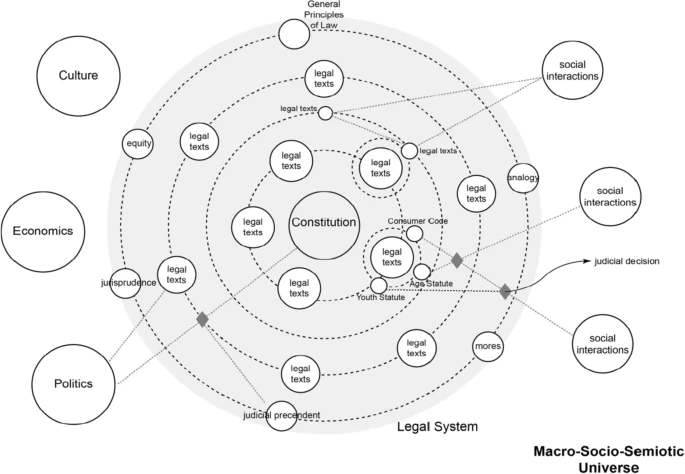
Semiotic mesh model of the legal system

== See also ==
- Encoding (semiotics)
- Encoding/decoding model of communication
- Models of communication
- Semiotic theory of Charles Sanders Peirce
- Semiotics

== Sources ==
- Anderson, S.J; Dewhirst, T.; Ling, P.M (2006). "Every document and picture tells a story: using internal corporate document reviews, semiotics, and content analysis to assess tobacco advertising". ProQuest.
- Chandler, Daniel. (2001–2007). Semiotics: The Basics. London: Routledge.
- Chandler, Daniel. Semiotics: The Basics. United Kingdom, Routledge, 2017.
- Cobley, Paul, and Peter Schulz. Theories and Models of Communication. Berlin, Boston: De Gruyter Mouton, 2013.
- Eadie, William, and Robin Goret. “Theories and models of communication: foundations and heritage.” Theories and Models of Communication, edited by Paul Cobley et al., Berlin, Boston: De Gruyter Mouton, 2013, pp. 17–36.
- Eco, Umberto. The Role of the Reader. London: Hutchinson. (1981)
- Fawkes, Johanna. “Public relations and communications.” The Public Relations Handbook, edited by Alison Theaker, Routledge, 2004, pp. 18–31.
- Lanigan, Richard. “Information theories.” Theories and Models of Communication, edited by Paul Cobley et al., Berlin, Boston: De Gruyter Mouton, 2013, pp. 59–84.
- Meagher, Michelle. “encoding/decoding.” The Concise Encyclopedia of Sociology, edited by George Ritzer et al., Blackwell Publishing, 2011, p. 185.
- Morley, David. Television, Audiences and Cultural Studies. London: Routledge. (1992)
- Tiefenbrun, Susan. Decoding International Law: Semiotics and the Humanities. Oxford University Press, 2010.
- Zakia, Richard D., and Mihai Nadin.(1987) “Semiotics, Advertising and Marketing.” Emerald Insight.
