= Semiotic democracy =

Semiotic democracy is a phrase coined by John Fiske, a media studies professor, in his seminal media studies book Television Culture (1987). Fiske defined the term as the "delegation of the production of meanings and pleasures to [television's] viewers." Fiske discussed how rather than being passive couch potatoes that absorbed information in an unmediated way, viewers actually gave their own meanings to the shows they watched that often differed substantially from the meaning intended by the show's producer.

Subsequently, this term was appropriated by the technical and legal community in the context of any re-working of cultural imagery by someone who is not the original author. Examples include fan fiction and slash fiction.

Legal scholars are concerned that just as technology eases the process of cheaply making and distributing derivative works imbued with new cultural meanings available to a wide public, copyright and right-to-publicity law is clamping down on and limiting these works, thus reducing their promulgation, and limiting semiotic democracy.

Prof. Terry Fisher of Harvard Law School has written about semiotic democracy in the context of the crisis facing the entertainment industry and in terms of the ability of people to use the Internet in creative new ways.

== See also ==
- Détournement
- Textual Poachers
- Reader-response criticism
- Reception theory
- Encoding/decoding model of communication
