= John Dixon Hunt =

English landscape historian (1936–2026)

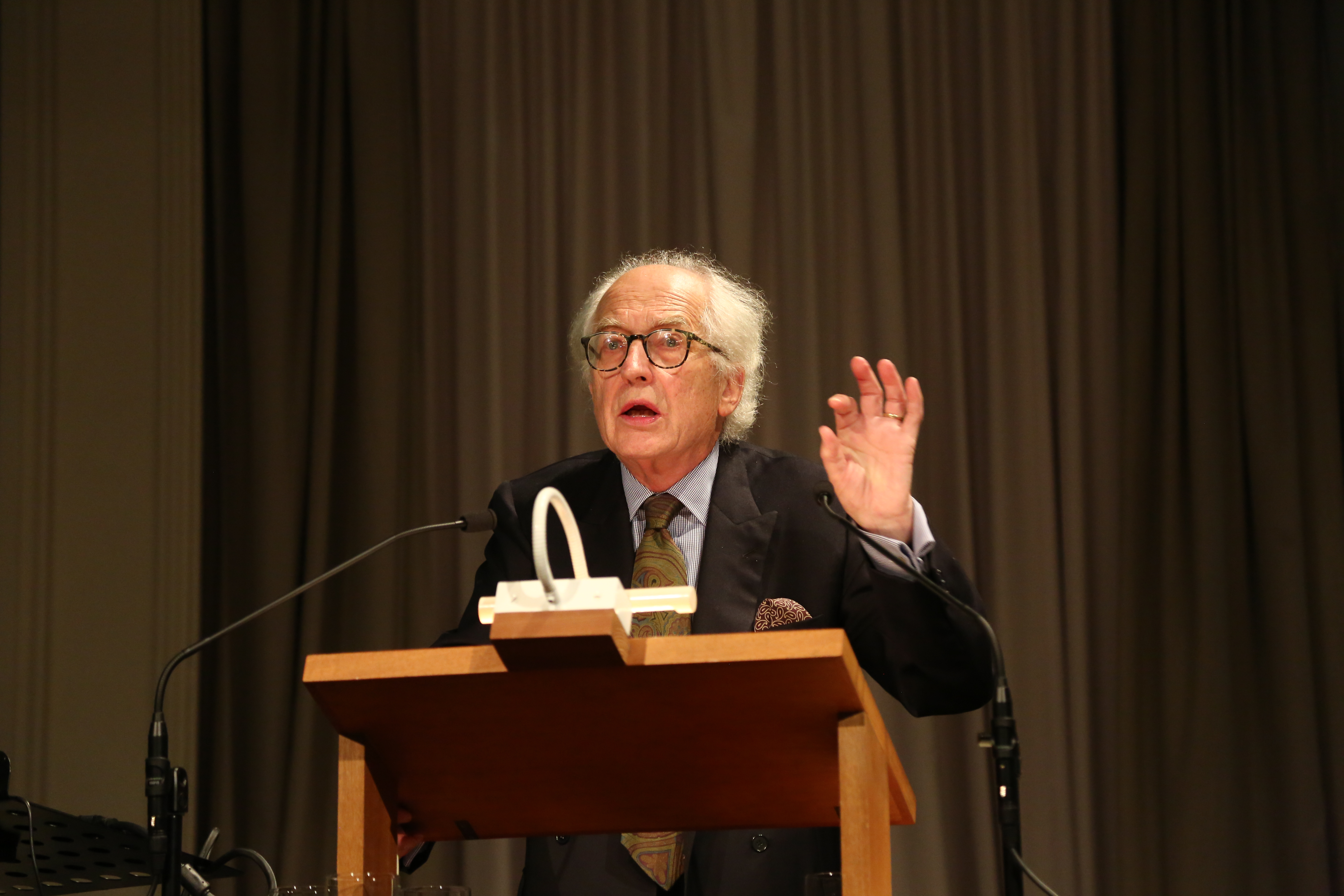
John Dixon Hunt, 2017

John Dixon Hunt (18 January 1936 – 27 September 2026) was an English landscape historian whose academic career began with teaching English literature. He became a professor at the University of Pennsylvania in 1994 and served as the department chair of landscape architecture and regional planning until June 2000, now being emeritus. One aspect of his work focuses on the time between the turn of the seventeenth through the end of the 18th centuries in France and England. He is the author of many articles, not only in landscape journals but also Apollo, Lincoln Center Theater Review, and Comparative Criticism, and chapters on topics including T. S. Eliot and modern painting, Utopia in and as garden, and garden as commemoration.

Hunt wrote numerous books which include The Pre-Raphaelite Imagination: 1848–1900 (Routledge & Kegan Paul, 1968), his Critical Commentary on Shakespeare’s "The Tempest" (Macmillan 1968), studies of Marvell, Ruskin, and William Kent, his classic Garden and Grove: The Italian Renaissance Garden in the English Imagination: 1600–1750 (J. M. Dent, 1986), Greater Perfections (University of Pennsylvania Press, 1999), The Picturesque Garden in Europe (Thames & Hudson, 2002), The Afterlife of Gardens (Reaktion Books, 2004), A World of Gardens (Reaktion Books, 2012) and The Making of Place: Modern and Contemporary Gardens (Reaktion Books, 2015).

== Early life ==
In his youth he walked extensively in the mountains of the English Lake District and in Switzerland, and spent time with his maternal grandfather, Frank Dixon, a school headmaster and entomologist. His parents moved to Bristol from his native Gloucester so that he could attend Bristol Grammar School. Hunt's father Sydney led a company of amateur actors, and Hunt envisioned a career on the stage for a period of time. He won a scholarship to King's College, Cambridge, and studied English literature, completing a B.A. and M.A. there, followed by a Ph.D. at Bristol University.

== Education ==
- Bristol Grammar School
- He earned his BA and MA at King's College, Cambridge.
- In 1964 he earned a PhD from the University of Bristol (UK).
- In May 2000 he was named Chevalier of the Order of Arts and Letters by the French Ministry of Culture for his exceptional endeavours in landscape architecture.
- In 2006 he was awarded an honorary degree of Doctor of Letters by the University of Bristol (UK).
- 2017 he received the Sckell-Ehrenring by the Bavarian Academy of Fine Arts

== Career ==
Hunt began his career with teaching positions in English literature with emphasis on its relationships with the visual arts at the University of Michigan, Vassar College, Exeter, York, Leiden, East Anglia, Bedford College, London and then Dumbarton Oaks where he was the Director of Studies in Landscape Architecture. His route to the study of landscapes began with his research into the 18th-century of Alexander Pope and a trip to Stowe, where he toured the grounds for several days with the history master of the boys' school there. Hunt has founded two prestigious academic journals: Word & Image (since 1985), which focuses on the relationship between the visual and the verbal, and Studies in the History of Gardens and Other Designed Landscapes (1981, originally Journal of Garden History). He has also held a number of fellowships including a tenure at the American Academy in Rome and has advised on Venetian garden restoration and botanical garden interpretive programs.

He became a professor at the University of Pennsylvania in 1994 and served as the department chair of landscape architecture and regional planning until June 2000. In June he went on sabbatical to pursue his interests in landscape architectural theory. When he returned Dean Gary Hack left for his sabbatical therefore leaving his position as Dean temporarily available and John Dixon Hunt was named to fill the position for a semester. John Dixon Hunt was a member of the Graduate Groups in PhD architecture, historic preservation, history of art, comparative literature and Center for Italian Studies Committee.

== Death ==
Hunt died on 27 September 2026, at the age of 90.

== Examples of his writings and thoughts ==
- Hunt defines landscape architecture as exterior place-making and sees the garden as having a "privileged position" within landscape architecture because gardens "are concentrated or perfected forms of place-making."(Greater Perfections)
- "The use of the term 'picturesque' today is generally limp, gesturing at best towards something visually attractive, perhaps old, quaint or scenic."(The Picturesque Garden in Europe)
- "Picturesque is the story that concerns the application of painterly art to the formation of gardens and landscapes; but understanding, presentation and augmentation of 'nature' in designed landscapes, and about their reception by all sorts of visitors, topics just as important in the annals of landscape architecture as a debt to painting."(The Picturesque Garden in Europe)

== Books ==
- The Pre-Raphaelite Imagination: 1848–1900 (Routledge & Kegan Paul, 1968)
- His Critical Commentary on Shakespeare’s “The Tempest” (Macmillan 1968)
- The Figure in the Landscape: Poetry, Painting, and Gardening during the Eighteenth Century, Baltimore and London:The Johns Hopkins University Press, 1976
- Andrew Marvell: His life and writings, Ithaca: Cornell University Press, 1978
- Garden and Grove: The Italian Renaissance Garden in the English Imagination 1600–1750, London and Melbourne:J.M. Dent & Sons Ltd, 1986
- William Kent, Landscape garden designer: An Assessment and Catalogue of his Designs, London:A. Zwemmer Ltd, 1987
- The Pastoral Landscape, Hanover, New Haven and London: National Gallery of Art, 1992.
- Gardens and the Picturesque: studies in the history of landscape architecture, Massachusetts:MIT Press, 1992.
- Greater Perfections: The Practice of Garden Theory, Philadelphia: University of Pennsylvania Press, 2000.
- The Picturesque Garden in Europe, London: Thames and Hudson, 2002.
- The Afterlife of Gardens, Philadelphia: University of Pennsylvania Press, 2004.
- Nature Over Again: The Garden Art of Ian Hamilton Finlay, London: Reaktion Books, 2009.
- The Venetian City Garden, Boston: Birkhäuser Architecture, 2009.
- A World of Gardens, London: Reaktion Books, 2012.
- Historical Ground: The role of history in contemporary landscape architecture, New York: Routledge, 2014.
- Plus many more...

== Edited books ==
- John Dixon Hunt (editor), Garden History: Issues, Approaches, Methods, Washington: Dumbarton Oaks Research Library and Collection, 1989.
- John Dixon Hunt (editor), The Italian Garden, Cambridge, New York and Melbourne: Cambridge University Press, 1996.
- John Dixon Hunt and Peter Willis (editors), The Genius of the Place: The English Landscape Garden 1620-1820, London: Paul Elek, 1975.
- John Dixon Hunt and Michel Conan (editors), Tradition and Innovation in French Garden Art, Philadelphia: University of Pennsylvania Press, 2002.
- Michael Leslie and John Dixon Hunt (editors), A Cultural History of Gardens (6 volumes), London: Bloomsbury, 2013.

== Articles and book chapters ==
- 'Emblem and Expressionism in the Eighteenth-Century Landscape Garden', Eighteenth-Century Studies, 4, 3, 1971, pp. 294–317.
- 'Marvell, Nun Appleton and the Buen Retiro', Philological Quarterly, 59, 1980, pp. 374–8.
- 'Pope's Twickenham Revisited', Eighteenth Century Life, 8, 2, 1983, pp. 26–35.
- 'Pope, Kent and 'Palladian' gardening', in G.S. Rousseau and Pat Rogers, The Enduring Legacy: Alexander Pope Tercentenary Essays, Cambridge: Cambridge University Press, 1988, pp. 121–132.
- 'Verbal versus Visual Meanings in Garden History: The Case of Rousham', in John Dixon Hunt, Garden History: Issues, Approaches and Methods, Washington: Dumbarton Oaks Research Library and Collection, 1989, pp. 151–181.
- Ut Pictura Poesis: The Garden and the Picturesque in England (1710–1750), in Monique Mosser and Georges Teyssot, The Architecture of Western Gardens: A Design History from the Renaissance to the Present Day, Cambridge, Massachusetts: The MIT PRess, 1991, pp. 231–242.
- 'Experiencing gardens in the Hypnerotomachia Polifili', Word & Image, 14, 109–119, 1998.

== See also ==
- Picturesque
- Landscape Architecture
- History of gardening
- Reception theory

== Sources ==
- Hunt, John. Greater Perfections. Philadelphia: University of Pennsylvania, 2000.
- Hunt, John D. "Personal Life." 2 November 2007. [e-mail]
- Hunt, John. The Afterlife of Gardens. Philadelphia: University of Pennsylvania Press, 2004.
- Hunt, John. The Picturesque Garden in Europe. New York: Thames & Hudson Inc., 2002.
