= Thomas Jörg =

German ice hockey player

- Born: December 2, 1981 (age 43); Immenstadt, Germany
- Height: 6 ft 1 in (185 cm)
- Weight: 187 lb (85 kg; 13 st 5 lb)
- Position: Forward
- Shoots: Left
- DEL team Former teams: Augsburger Panther; DEG Metro Stars; ERC Ingolstadt
- Playing career: 2000–present

Thomas Jörg (born December 2, 1981) is a German professional ice hockey forward who currently plays for Augsburger Panther of the Deutsche Eishockey Liga (DEL).

== Career statistics ==
			Regular season					Playoffs
Season	Team	League	GP	G	A	Pts	PIM	GP	G	A	Pts	PIM
1999–00	ESV Kaufbeuren	4.GBun	2	0	0	0	2	—	—	—	—	—
2000–01	ESV Kaufbeuren	3.GBun	21	0	5	5	4	3	0	1	1	0
2001–02	ESV Kaufbeuren	3.GBun	50	19	30	49	50	12	1	7	8	8
2002–03	ESV Kaufbeuren	2.GBun	54	19	15	34	42	—	—	—	—	—
2003–04	DEG Metro Stars	DEL	52	1	1	2	18	4	0	0	0	0
2004–05	DEG Metro Stars	DEL	52	5	8	13	32	—	—	—	—	—
2004–05	Essen Moskitos	2.GBun	6	3	0	3	4	—	—	—	—	—
2005–06	DEG Metro Stars	DEL	50	10	12	22	55	14	2	0	2	16
2006–07	DEG Metro Stars	DEL	51	3	5	8	28	9	0	1	1	2
2007–08	ERC Ingolstadt	DEL	46	4	9	13	22	1	0	0	0	0
2008–09	Augsburger Panther	DEL	47	7	13	20	87	4	0	0	0	0
2009–10	Augsburger Panther	DEL	42	3	3	6	18	9	1	0	1	0
2010–11	Augsburger Panther	DEL	6	0	0	0	0	—	—	—	—	—
DEL totals			346	33	51	84	260	41	3	1	4	18
