= Joseph Edmund Jörg =

Joseph Edmund Jörg (23 December 1819, Immenstadt, Bavaria – 18 November 1901, Landshut) was a Catholic historian and politician.

== Biography ==
Jörg was the son of a subaltern. He first studied theology, then philology and history at Munich. He was a pupil of Ignaz von Döllinger, and was for years his collaborator in his Geschichte der Reformation. In 1852 he was engaged in the Bavarian Record Office, and undertook in the same year the editorship of the Historisch-politische Blätter I which he retained (from 1857 with Franz Binder) till a short time before his death. For decades his Zeitläufte, which appeared in this periodical, attracted great attention.

On account of his opposition to the government, Jörg was transferred to Neuburg an der Donau, but was elected in 1863 a substitute member of the Bavarian Lower House, to which he belonged till 1881. He was promoted in 1866 to the position of district archivist in Landshut; from 1868 to 1869 he was a member of the German Zollparlament, and from 1874 to 1878 a member of the German Reichstag.

Jörg was a conservative, a convinced Bavarian monarchist and a determined opponent of the Bavarian Liberal Party and of the subordination of Bavaria to Prussia. The Bavarian Volkspartei ("People's Party") grew with his cooperation in a few years from a modest group to a majority in the House (1869).

Under King Maximilian II of Bavaria, Jorg was violently opposed to the ministry of von der Pfordten, as he was also to the alliance made with Prussia (22 August) due to the war of 1866. His address to the House in January, 1870, occasioned the resignation of Prince Hohenlohe with a part of his cabinet. But henceforth events took their course uninfluenced by Jörg. At the outbreak of the Franco-Prussian War, he advocated the armed neutrality of Bavaria, but was deserted in the House by a number of his party; he was thus unable to prevent his country's participation in the war and the entrance of Bavaria by the Treaty of Versailles, into the new state of Germany. However, he afterwards loyally accepted the new order of things. In the Reichstag his proposal to call a meeting of the committee for foreign affairs under the presidency of Bavaria gave rise to a violent conflict with Bismarck on 4 December 1874. His attack on the Lutz ministry in 1875 failed because of the opposition of the Crown. He left the Reichstag in 1878, and three years later the Bavarian House, thereby ending his public life.

The last twenty years of his life were passed in Trausnitz Castle near Landshut (whence he was known as the "Hermit of Trausnitz"), and the remainder of his days were devoted to his journalistic work amid his duties in the district archives of Landshut, and to writing his Memoirs.

== Works ==
His first work, Deutschland in der Revolutionsperiode, 1522-26 (1851), was a history of the German Peasants' War. The later books, Geschichte des Protestantismus in seiner neuesten Entwickelung (1858) and Die Rene Aera in Preussen (1860), are a collection of separate essays published in the paper Historisch-politische Blätter. He was interested in the development of socialism, and as early as 1867 his Geschichte der sozialpolitischen Parteien in Deutschland appeared, having originated in his "Aphorisms" on the socialist movement, published in the Historisch-politische Blätter.
