= Polysemy =

Capacity for a sign to have multiple related meanings

Polysemy (/pəˈlɪsɪmi/ or /ˈpɒlɪˌsiːmi/; from Ancient Greek πολύ- (polý-) 'many' and σῆμα (sêma) 'sign') is the capacity for a sign (e.g. a symbol, morpheme, word, or phrase) to have multiple related meanings. For example, a word can have several word senses. Polysemy is the opposite of monosemy, which denotes a word with a single meaning.

Polysemy is distinct from homonymy—or homophony—which is an accidental similarity between two or more words (such as bear the animal, and the verb bear) : while homonymy is a mere linguistic coincidence, polysemy is not. In discerning whether a given set of meanings represent polysemy or homonymy, it is often necessary to look at the history of the word to see whether the two meanings are historically related. Dictionary writers often list polysemes (words or phrases with different, but related, senses) in the same entry (that is, under the same headword) and enter homonyms as separate headwords (usually with a numbering convention such as ¹bear and ²bear).

== Polysemes ==
A polyseme is a word or phrase with different, but related, senses. Since the test for polysemy is the vague concept of the relatedness, judgments of polysemy can be difficult to make. Because applying pre-existing words to new situations is a natural process of language change, looking at words' etymology is helpful in determining polysemy but not the only solution; as words become lost in etymology, what once was a useful distinction of meaning may no longer be so. Some seemingly unrelated words share a common historical origin, however, so etymology is not an infallible test for polysemy, and dictionary writers also often defer to speakers' intuitions to judge polysemy in cases where it contradicts etymology. English has many polysemous words. For example, the verb "to get" can mean "procure" (I'll get the drinks), "become" (she got scared), "understand" (I get it) etc.

In linear or vertical polysemy, one sense of a word is a subset of the other. These are examples of hyponymy and hypernymy, and are sometimes called autohyponyms. For example, 'dog' can be used for 'male dog'. Alan Cruse identifies four types of linear polysemy:

- autohyponymy, where the basic sense leads to a specialised sense (from "drinking (anything)" to "drinking (alcohol)")
- automeronymy, where the basic sense leads to a subpart sense (from "door (whole structure)" to "door (panel)")
- autohyperonymy or autosuperordination, where the basic sense leads to a wider sense (from "(female) cow" to "cow (of either sex)")
- autoholonymy, where the basic sense leads to a larger sense (from "leg (thigh and calf)" to "leg (thigh, calf, knee and foot)")

In non-linear polysemy, the original sense of a word is used figuratively to provide a different way of looking at the new subject. Alan Cruse identifies three types of non-linear polysemy:

- metonymy, where one sense "stands for" another (from "hands (body part)" to "hands (manual labourers)")
- metaphor, where there is a resemblance between senses (from "swallowing (a pill)" to "swallowing (an argument)")
- other construals (for example, from "month (of the year)" to "month (30 days)")

There are several tests for polysemy, but one of them is zeugma: if one word seems to exhibit zeugma when applied in different contexts, it is probable that the contexts bring out different polysemes of the same word. If the two senses of the same word do not seem to fit, yet seem related, then it is probable that they are polysemous. This test again depends on speakers' judgments about relatedness, which means that it is not infallible, but merely a helpful conceptual aid.

The difference between homonyms and polysemes is subtle. Lexicographers define polysemes within a single dictionary lemma, while homonyms are treated in separate entries, numbering different meanings (or lemmata). Semantic shift can separate a polysemous word into separate homonyms. For example, check as in "bank check" (or Cheque), check in chess, and check meaning "verification" are considered homonyms, while they originated as a single word derived from chess in the 14th century. Psycholinguistic experiments have shown that homonyms and polysemes are represented differently within people's mental lexicon: while the different meanings of homonyms (which are semantically unrelated) tend to interfere or compete with each other during comprehension, this does not usually occur for the polysemes that have semantically related meanings. Results for this contention, however, have been mixed.

For Dick Hebdige, polysemy means that, "each text is seen to generate a potentially infinite range of meanings," making, according to Richard Middleton, "any homology, out of the most heterogeneous materials, possible. The idea of signifying practice—texts not as communicating or expressing a pre-existing meaning but as 'positioning subjects' within a process of semiosis—changes the whole basis of creating social meaning".

Charles Fillmore and Beryl Atkins' definition stipulates three elements: (i) the various senses of a polysemous word have a central origin, (ii) the links between these senses form a network, and (iii) understanding the 'inner' one contributes to understanding of the 'outer' one.

One group of polysemes are those in which a word meaning an activity, perhaps derived from a verb, acquires the meanings of those engaged in the activity, or perhaps the results of the activity, or the time or place in which the activity occurs or has occurred. Sometimes only one of those meanings is intended, depending on context, and sometimes multiple meanings are intended at the same time. Other types are derivations from one of the other meanings that leads to a verb or activity.

=== Examples in English ===
Man
1. The human species (i.e., man vs. other organisms)
2. Males of the human species (i.e., man vs. woman)
3. Adult males of the human species (i.e., man vs. boy)
4. (As a verb) to operate or constitute a vehicle or machine (To man a ship)

This example shows the specific polysemy where the same word is used at different levels of a taxonomy.

Bank
1. a financial institution
2. the physical building where a financial institution offers services
3. to deposit money or have an account in a bank (e.g. "I bank at the local credit union")
4. a supply of something held in reserve: such as "banking" brownie points
5. a synonym for 'rely upon' (e.g. "I'm your friend, you can bank on me"). It is different, but related, as it derives from the theme of security initiated by 1.
However: 1 is borrowed from Italian banco, a money lender's bench, while a river bank is a native English word. Today they can be considered homonyms with completely different meanings. But originally they were polysemous, since Italian borrowed the word from a Germanic language. The Proto-Germanic cognate for "bank" is *bankiz. A river bank is typically visually bench-like in its flatness.

According to the Oxford English Dictionary, the three most polysemous words in English are run, put, and set, in that order.

== Related ideas ==
A notion related to polysemy is colexification – namely, the case when several meanings are expressed by the same word. The main difference between the two notions is one of perspective: polysemy is usually taken in a semasiological way, going from a form to its meanings; whereas colexification is onomasiological, starting from individual meanings and observing how they are colexified (or its opposite, dislexified) in languages.

A lexical conception of polysemy was developed by B. T. S. Atkins, in the form of lexical implication rules. These are rules that describe how words, in one lexical context, can then be used, in a different form, in a related context. A crude example of such a rule is the pastoral idea of "verbizing one's nouns": that certain nouns, used in certain contexts, can be converted into a verb, conveying a related meaning.

Another clarification of polysemy is the idea of predicate transfer—the reassignment of a property to an object that would not otherwise inherently have that property. Thus, the expression "I am parked out back" conveys the meaning of "parked" from "car" to the property of "I possess a car". This avoids incorrect polysemous interpretations of "parked": that "people can be parked", or that "I am pretending to be a car", or that "I am something that can be parked". This is supported by the morphology: "We are parked out back" does not mean that there are multiple cars; rather, that there are multiple passengers (having the property of being in possession of a car).

== See also ==
- Amphiboly
- Aberrant decoding
- Ambiguous grammar
- Dog-whistle politics
- Essentially contested concept
- Heterosemy
- Homograph
  - Interlingual homograph
- Idiom
- Metonymy
- Monosemy
- Polytely
- Pronoun game
- Pun
- Semantic change
  - Euphemism treadmill
- Syncretism (linguistics)
- Syntactic ambiguity
- Troponymy
