= Reception theory =

Type of literary theory

Reception theory is a version of reader response literary theory that emphasizes each particular reader's reception or interpretation in making meaning from a literary text. Reception theory is generally referred to as audience reception in the analysis of communications models. In literary studies, reception theory originated from the work of Hans-Robert Jauss in the late 1960s, and the most influential work was produced during the 1970s and early 1980s in Germany and the US (Fortier 132), with some notable work done in other Western European countries. A form of reception theory has also been applied to the study of historiography.

The cultural theorist Stuart Hall was one of the main proponents of reception theory, first developed in his 1973 essay 'Encoding and Decoding in the Television Discourse'. His approach, called the encoding/decoding model of communication, is a form of textual analysis that focuses on the scope of "negotiation" and "opposition" by the audience. This means that a "text"—be it a book, movie, or other creative work—is not simply passively accepted by the audience, but that the reader/viewer interprets the meanings of the text based on her or his individual cultural background and life experiences. In essence, the meaning of a text is not inherent within the text itself, but is created within the relationship between the text and the reader.

Hall also developed a theory of encoding and decoding, Hall's theory, which focuses on the communication processes at play in texts that are in televisual form.

Reception theory has since been extended to the spectators of performative events, focusing predominantly on the theatre. Susan Bennett is often credited with beginning this discourse. Reception theory has also been applied to the history and analysis of landscapes, through the work of the landscape historian John Dixon Hunt, as Hunt recognized that the survival of gardens and landscapes is largely related to their public reception.

== General ==
A basic acceptance of the meaning of a specific text tends to occur when a group of readers have a shared cultural background and interpret the text in similar ways. It is likely that the less shared heritage a reader has with the artist, the less he or she will be able to recognise the artist's intended meaning, and it follows that if two readers have vastly different cultural and personal experiences, their reading of a text will vary greatly. Umberto Eco coined the term aberrant decoding to describe the case when the reader's interpretation differs from what the artist intended.

== Landscape architecture ==
In literature, the interaction between text and reader occurs within a framework that controls and limits the interaction, through genre, tone, structure, and the social conditions of the reader and author, whereas in landscapes the interaction occurs through movement and viewing, framed by typology instead of genre and tone. Instead of an "implied reader", reception theory of landscapes assumes an "implied visitor", who is an abstracted concatenation of responses of many visitors at different times.

The theory recognizes that there is no single reading of a landscape that fulfills its entire potential, and that it is important to examine the motives of visitors and the factors influencing their visits (whether they read guidebooks about the place before visiting, or had strong feelings about the place or the designer, for instance).

One key difference between reception theory in literature and reception theory in landscape architecture is that while literary works are accessible only to the imagination, physical landscapes are accessible to the senses as well as to the imagination.

Reception theoretical analysis of architecture differs from typical writing on the history and analysis of landscapes, which tends to focus on the intentions of the designers, the conditions leading to the creation of the design, and the building process. Reception theory also tends to de-emphasize commonly used terms of description like 'formal' and 'picturesque', unless those terms were known to have meaning to landscape visitors themselves.

== Reception history ==
According to Harold Marcuse, an academic and grandson of Herbert Marcuse, reception history is "the history of the meanings that have been imputed to historical events. It traces the different ways in which participants, observers, historians and other retrospective interpreters have attempted to make sense of events both as they unfolded and over time since then, to make those events meaningful for the present in which they lived and live."

=== Reception history and the Bible ===
One area of scholarship where reception history has been explored deeply is the reception history of the Bible. In the context of the Bible, reception history comprises the manifold interpretations of the biblical text from the time that it was written until now. It aims to show how biblical interpretations have developed throughout the centuries. The field that predated the reception history of the Bible has been known as the “history of interpretation” or “history of exegesis.” The greatest difference between reception history and its predecessor approach is that reception history does not restrict its interpretations. It includes interpretations that are marginal and even unorthodox. Reception history does not restrict interpretations by medium either; it includes the use of art, music, poetry, and liturgy. In contrast, the history of interpretation is concerned with how biblical scholars have interpreted a text in only their commentaries and monographs.

Hans-Georg Gadamer addresses the reception of the Bible in his interpretative framework. Gadamer was concerned with displaying how all interpretive acts are contextualized. At the same time, however, Gadamer maintained the integrity of empirical knowledge. Gadamer saw the contextualized interpretation of scripture and the empirical knowledge about its development are best understood to be in a dialogical relationship with one another. In this sense, it is a diachronic approach to interpretation of the Bible. The individual contexts of interpreters in communication with the original text is the basis for reception history of the bible.

One of the key issues surrounding biblical reception history is locating when it began. This issue is sometimes addressed by demarcating a shift from the original text and its reception. However, the distinction of an original text becomes difficult because of the various forms of the earlier biblical texts that were being used. Because of the various sources, traditions, and editions of the earliest biblical texts it is difficult to know what was considered original and was interpreted. Related to this issue of numerous source materials in biblical reception is the context of these source materials. If one wishes to try and read the original text, one is required to do so in its historical context lest it become detached and lose their meaning. The various contexts that are associated with each of the contributing texts does not allow for there to be a single context in which to read the text correctly. This again muddles the difference between original text and reception history of the Bible.

== See also ==
- Classical reception studies
- Horizon of expectation
- Semiotic democracy
- Postcritique
- Influence and reception of Friedrich Nietzsche
- Influence and reception of Søren Kierkegaard
- Reception history of Jane Austen
- Reception of J. R. R. Tolkien
- Shakespeare's reputation
