= John Fiske (media scholar) =

British, Australian, and American media scholar and cultural theorist (1939–2021)

- Born: September 12, 1939; Bristol, England
- Died: July 12, 2021 (aged 81); Ipswich, Massachusetts
- Occupations: Media scholar and cultural theorist

Academic background
- Education: Cambridge University (BA, MA)
- Academic advisor: Raymond Williams

Academic work
- Discipline: Cultural studies
- Sub-discipline: Popular culture; Semiotics; Television studies
- Institutions: Sheffield Polytechnic; Polytechnic of Wales; Curtin University (1980–1988); University of Wisconsin–Madison (1988–2000)

John Fiske (September 12, 1939 – July 12, 2021) was a British, Australian, and American media scholar and cultural theorist. His primary areas of scholarly interest included cultural studies, critical analysis of popular culture, media semiotics, and television studies. After retiring emeritus, he became an antiques dealer.

He was the author of eight academic books, including Power Plays, Power Works (1993), Understanding Popular Culture (1989), Reading the Popular (1989), and the influential Television Culture (1987) and Reading Television (1978). Fiske was also a media critic, examining how cultural meaning has been created in American society and how debates over issues such as race have been handled in different media.

== Early life and education ==
Fiske was born September 12, 1939 in Bristol, England, and raised in the Cotswolds. He received a BA and an MA in English Literature from Cambridge University, where he studied under the renowned leftist literary and cultural critic and activist Raymond Williams. While at Cambridge, he was a member of the Cambridge Footlights amateur dramatic club as a peer of several of Monty Python's founding members.

== Academic career ==
After graduating from Cambridge University, Fiske taught in the United Kingdom and throughout the world including Australia, New Zealand and the United States. His primary areas of scholarly interest included cultural studies, critical analysis of popular culture, media semiotics, and television studies.

His first academic positions were principal lecturer at Sheffield Polytechnic, where he designed the first undergraduate degree in communication in the United Kingdom, and then principal lecturer in Communication at the Polytechnic of Wales, where he supervised the first Ph.D. candidate in Communication in the United Kingdom. At the Polytechnic of Wales, he collaborated with John Hartley to publish Reading Television in 1978. The book was the first to analyse television from a cultural perspective and is considered a defining publication in the field; it sold over 100,000 copies, in seven languages. It was noted for the influence of the French structuralists Ferdinand de Saussure, Louis Althusser, Roland Barthes, and Claude Lévi-Strauss.

In 1980, he relocated to Australia to work in Perth at the Western Australia Institute of Technology, now Curtin University since 1986, where he was principal lecturer in the School of Communication and Cultural Studies. Here, he worked with Graeme Turner, Bob Hodge, John Hartley, and others to found the Australian Journal of Cultural Studies in 1983, the first journal in the field in Australia, and to build up the first national programs in the field. He was instrumental in transferring British cultural studies to Australia, particularly materials from the Open University and the Centre for Contemporary Cultural Studies. In 1987, the Australian Journal of Cultural Studies grew into the international journal Cultural Studies, for which Fiske served as general editor until ceding leadership to Lawrence Grossberg. In this period Fiske wrote Television Culture (1987), Myths of Oz: Reading Australian Popular Culture (1987, with Graeme Turner and Bob Hodge), Reading the Popular (1989), and Understanding Popular Culture (1989); each of these contrasted popular culture to mass culture and focused on the potentials for audience agency in media consumption.

In 1988, Fiske moved to the US to become professor of Communication Arts at the University of Wisconsin-Madison, where he remained until retiring emeritus in 2000. In the US, his next books Power Plays, Power Works (1993) and Media Matters (1996) began to focus more on politics and power in cultural studies, and in these he now brought in the influences of French post-structuralists Pierre Bourdieu, Michel Foucault, and Michel de Certeau. In this period he became a widely-recognized and controversial figure, called both "a lightning rod" and a "bad boy," as he focused his work on debates about racial and sexual politics in popular media. Critics particularly doubted Fiske's optimism about what bottom-up audience agency, what he called semiotic democracy, could actually accomplish in the face of top-down media control.

Overall, Fiske was particularly noted as a popularizer and a writer of textbooks, translating the theory of cultural studies for broader audiences.

== Later career and death ==
Fiske retired from academia in 2000 and settled with his wife Lisa Freeman in Vermont, where he began a second career as an antiques dealer trading as Fiske & Freeman: Fine and Early Antiques. His specialty was seventeenth-century English oak furniture. He was the editor-in-chief of The New England Antiques Journal (2004–2018) and founding publisher of the online Digital Antiques Journal (2018–2021). Fiske published several books on seventeenth-century furniture including Living with Early Oak and When Oak Was New.

In 2008, Fiske and Freeman moved to Ipswich, Massachusetts and he became an active leader in local historic preservation efforts, particularly restoration of the John Whipple House.

In 2010, cultural studies scholars held a "Fiske Matters" conference in Madison, Wisconsin in honor of the tenth anniversary of his retirement from academia.

Fiske died on July 12, 2021.

== Honors ==
In 2000, Fiske was granted emeritus status by University of Wisconsin–Madison as a professor of Letters and Science/Communication Arts after having taught at the University for 12 years. In May 2008, Fiske received an Honorary Doctoral Degree from the University of Antwerp.

== Theory ==
=== Semiotics and television studies ===
Fiske was one of the first scholars to apply semiotics to television following the tradition of poststructuralism, and coined the term semiotic democracy.

He is the author of works on television studies regarding popular culture and mass media. Fiske's books analyze television shows as semiotic "texts" in order to examine the different layers of meaning and sociocultural content. Fiske rejects the notion that assumes "the audience" as an uncritical mass, the theory that mass audiences consume the products that are offered to them without thought. He instead suggests "audiences" as being of various social backgrounds and identities that enable them to receive texts differently.

Fiske's 1987 book, Television Culture, introduces the subject of television studies by examining the economic and cultural issues, as well as the theory and text-based criticism, involving television. It also provides an overview of the arguments by British, American, Australian, and French scholars. It was "one of the first books about television to take seriously the feminist agenda that has been so important to the recent development of the field."

=== Power ===
In Power Plays, Power Works (1993), Fiske argues that power "is a systematic set of operations upon people that works to ensure the maintenance of the social order…and ensure its smooth running."

Through the book, Fiske coined the term "power bloc" in reference to the social and political economic constructs around which power functions in the contemporary Western world. Rather than constituting a particular class or permanently defined socio-political group, power blocs are unsystematic series of both strategic and tactical political alliances. These constantly changing partnerships form whenever circumstances emerge that jeopardize the socio-political advantages of the members involved. They therefore arise and separate on an ad hoc basis (i.e., depending on the necessities of the moment), and their alliance is specific to matters of social, cultural, historic, and/or imminent relevance.

Those who fall outside of the bloc—and fall under its "authority"—can be understood as the notion of "the people." Such people may still possess power of their own, however it is a weaker power—what Fiske refers to as a "localizing power".

In Understanding Popular Culture (1989), Fiske maintains that culture is integral to social power:

Culture (and its meanings and pleasures) is a constant succession of social practices; it is therefore inherently political, it is centrally involved in the distribution and possible redistribution of various forms of social power.

== Selected bibliography ==
=== Cultural Studies ===
==== Books ====
- 1978. Reading Television, with John Hartley. London: Methuen & Co. ISBN 0-415-04291-7.
- 1982. Introduction to Communication Studies, Studies in Culture and Communication. London: Methuen & Co. ISBN 0-415-04672-6.
- 1984. "Popularity and Ideology: A Structuralist Reading of Dr Who." In Interpreting Television: Current Research Perspectives, edited by Willard D. Rowland Jr. and Bruce Watkins. SAGE Annual Reviews of Communication Research, Vol. 12. ISBN 0-803-92393-7.
- 1987. Television Culture, Studies in Communication Series. London: Methuen & Co. ISBN 0-415-03934-7.
- 1989. Reading the Popular. London: Unwin Hyman Ltd. ISBN 978-0-415-07875-7.
- 1989. Understanding Popular Culture. New York: Routledge. ISBN 978-0-415-07876-4.
- 1992. "British Cultural Studies and Television." In Channels of Discourse, Reassembled, edited by R. C. Allen. Routledge. ISBN 978-0-8078-4374-1.
- 1994. Media Matters: Everyday Culture and Political Change. Minneapolis: University of Minneapolis Press. ISBN 9780816624621.
- 1993. Power Plays, Power Works. Routledge. ISBN 0-86091-616-2
- 1996. Media Matters: Race and Gender in U.S. Politics. Routledge. ISBN 978-0-8166-2463-8.

==== Interviews and lectures ====
- 1990/1991. "An Interview with John Fiske." Border/Lines 20/21(Winter):4–7.
- 2000. "Interview with John Fiske," with Mick O'Regan. The Media Report. Australia: ABC Radio National.
- 2000. "'Surveillance and the self: Some issues for cultural studies'" (lecture), Television: Past, Present, and Future.

=== Antiques ===
- 2006. Living with Early Oak: Seventeenth Century Furniture Then and Now, with Lisa Freeman. Belmont Press. ISBN 978-0975456903
- 2013. When Oak was New: English Furniture and Daily Life 1530-1700. Belmont Press. ISBN 978-0975456927
