= Encoding (semiotics) =

Process of creating a message for transmission

In semiotics, encoding is the process of creating a message for transmission by an addresser to an addressee. The complementary process – interpreting a message received from an addresser – is called decoding.

== Discussion ==
The process of message exchanges, or semiosis, is a key characteristic of human life depending on rule-governed and learned codes that, for the most part, unconsciously guide the communication of meaning between individuals. These interpretive frameworks or linking grids were termed "myths" by Roland Barthes (1915–1980) and pervade all aspects of culture from personal conversation to the mass media's output (for code exchange through the mass media, see Americanism).

Early theorists like Saussure (1857–1913) proposed the theory that when the addresser wishes to transmit a message to an addressee, the intended meaning must be converted into content so that it can be delivered. Roman Jakobson (1896–1982) offered a structuralist theory that the transmission and response would not sustain an efficient discourse unless the parties used the same codes in the appropriate social contexts. But, Barthes shifted the emphasis from the semiotics of language to the exploration of semiotics as language.

Now, as Daniel Chandler states, there is no such thing as an uncoded message: all experience is coded. So when the addresser is planning the particular message, both denotative and connotative meanings will already be attached to the range of signifiers relevant to the message. Within the broad framework of syntactic and semantic codes, the addresser will select signifiers that, in the particular context, will best represent his or her values and purposes. But the medium of communication is not necessarily neutral and the ability of the addressee to accurately decode the message may be affected by a number of factors. So the addresser must attempt to compensate for the known problems when constructing the final version of the message and hope that the preferred meanings will be identified when the message is received.

One of the techniques is to structure the message so that certain aspects are given salience (sometimes called foregrounding) and predispose the audience to interpret the whole in the light of the particular. This relates to Gestalt psychology, Max Wertheimer (1880–1943) examined the factors that determine grouping in cognitive processes:

1. the fact of grouping signs together predisposes an uncritical audience to perceive the signs as similar;
2. the audience prefers closure, i.e. it prefers the experience to be as complete as possible and to see things as a whole even though no actual continuity or conclusion is implied; and
3. the audience prefers an everyman's version of Occam's Razor, i.e. the simplest explanations and solutions. In real life that means that assumptions, inferences and prejudices can often fill in gaps. If a conclusion seems to fit the available facts, other possibilities are not considered or are disregarded, producing the suggestion that humans conserve cognitive energy whenever they can and avoid thinking.

If an addresser is writing a speech, rhetorical tropes may be used to emphasise the elements that the audience is to focus upon and potentially perceive as predicating a particular conclusion. If images are to be selected, metonymy may indicate common associational values with the preferred meaning of the text.
