= Mission Garden =

Living agricultural museum in Tucson, Arizona

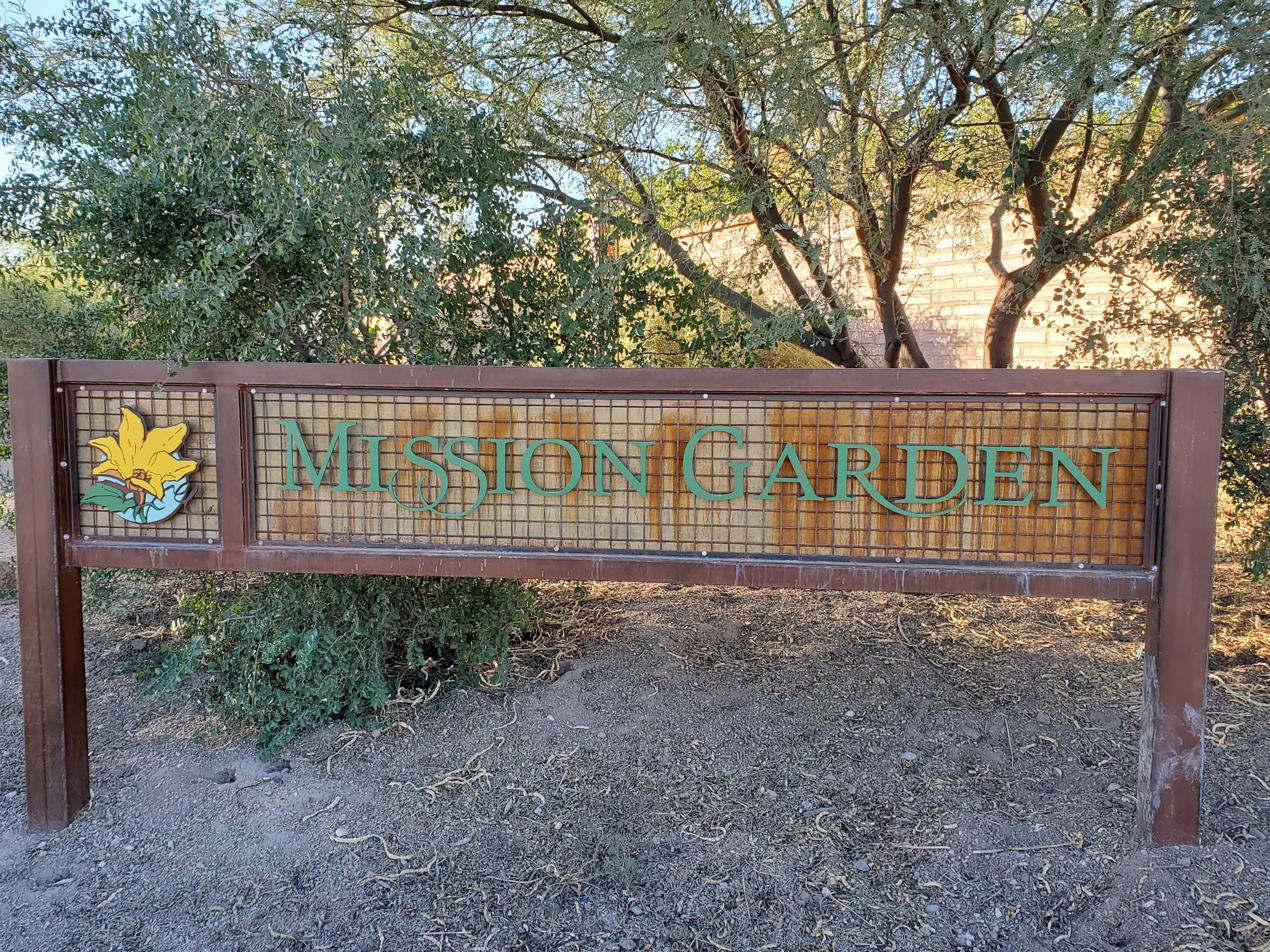
- Sign welcoming visitors to Mission Garden
- Location: 946 W. Mission Lane, Tucson, AZ, United States
- Coordinates: 32°12′49″N 110°59′14″W
- Type: Living agricultural museum
- Visitors: 17,000 (2023)
- Executive director: Alyce Sadongei
- Parking: On site (no charge)
- Website: www.missiongarden.org

Mission Garden is a living agricultural museum near Sentinel Peak in Tucson, Arizona. Its adobe walls enclose four acres of heritage crops and heirloom trees that represent people who have lived in the Sonoran Desert for more than 4,000 years. The property was listed on the National Register of Historic Places in 2026.

== Introduction ==
The agricultural practices featured in Mission Garden include those of Hohokam, Tohono O’odham, Spanish colonials and other Europeans, Mexicans, Chinese, and people of African descent. As a result, Mission Garden grows crops that originated in many areas of the world. A few are listed in the Ark of Taste's catalog of heritage foods. White Sonora wheat and O'odham pink bean exemplify local foods in this catalog.

Map showing origins of major agricultural crops worldwide

Mission Garden's constantly changing garden areas show cultivars and farming methods that have succeeded in the Sonoran Desert. Throughout the year, Mission Garden also hosts regular and special events featuring these food plants. The gardens and events combine traditional and modern knowledge related to agriculture in a hot and arid region. This focus is relevant in the context of food insecurity and climate change. Collaborations with other organizations also advance Mission Garden's mission:

Mission Garden inspires people to connect to this land by reclaiming agricultural traditions for our community in a changing world.

This historical and cultural resource figured in Tucson's application to UNESCO's Creative Cities Network. In 2015, Tucson became the first City of Gastronomy in the United States. It is noted especially for its culture and development of Sonoran Mexican cuisine. Media attention has included pieces in Bon Appétit, the Boston Globe, the Denver Post, Forbes, and the New York Times.

== History of the site ==
The site is in the watershed of the 210-mile Santa Cruz River (Arizona). This area has been continuously farmed for over 4000 years. Archeological research establishes that early inhabitants grew maize, beans, squash, and agave. These crops supplemented other food sources, such as foraged mesquite beans and acorns. Mission Garden represents this early agriculture in the agave-covered hillside along the entrance path, an agave roasting pit, a reconstructed pithouse, and plots growing Hohokam crops such as corn.

Plots also represent the Tohono O’odham, who were called Papago by Spanish colonials who came to the area in the 1690s. When the Jesuit priest Eusebio Kino arrived in 1697, he found people raising crops such as corn and cotton with the summer monsoons. Also, they used small canals to distribute the river's water. After the Spanish arrived, the O’odham people living near the mission added winter crops such as winter wheat to their diet.

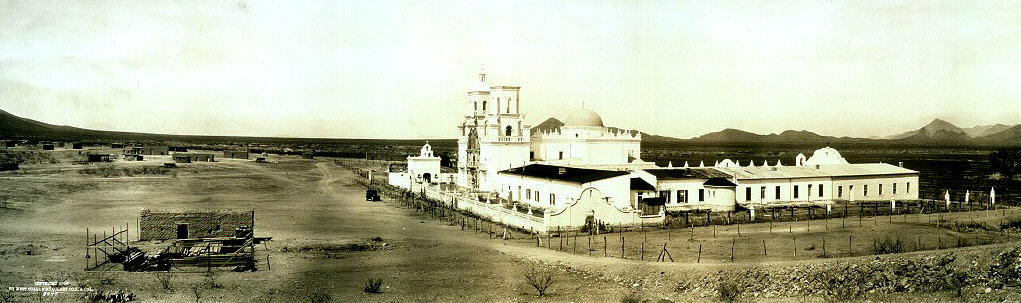
Mission San Xavier del Bac – c1913

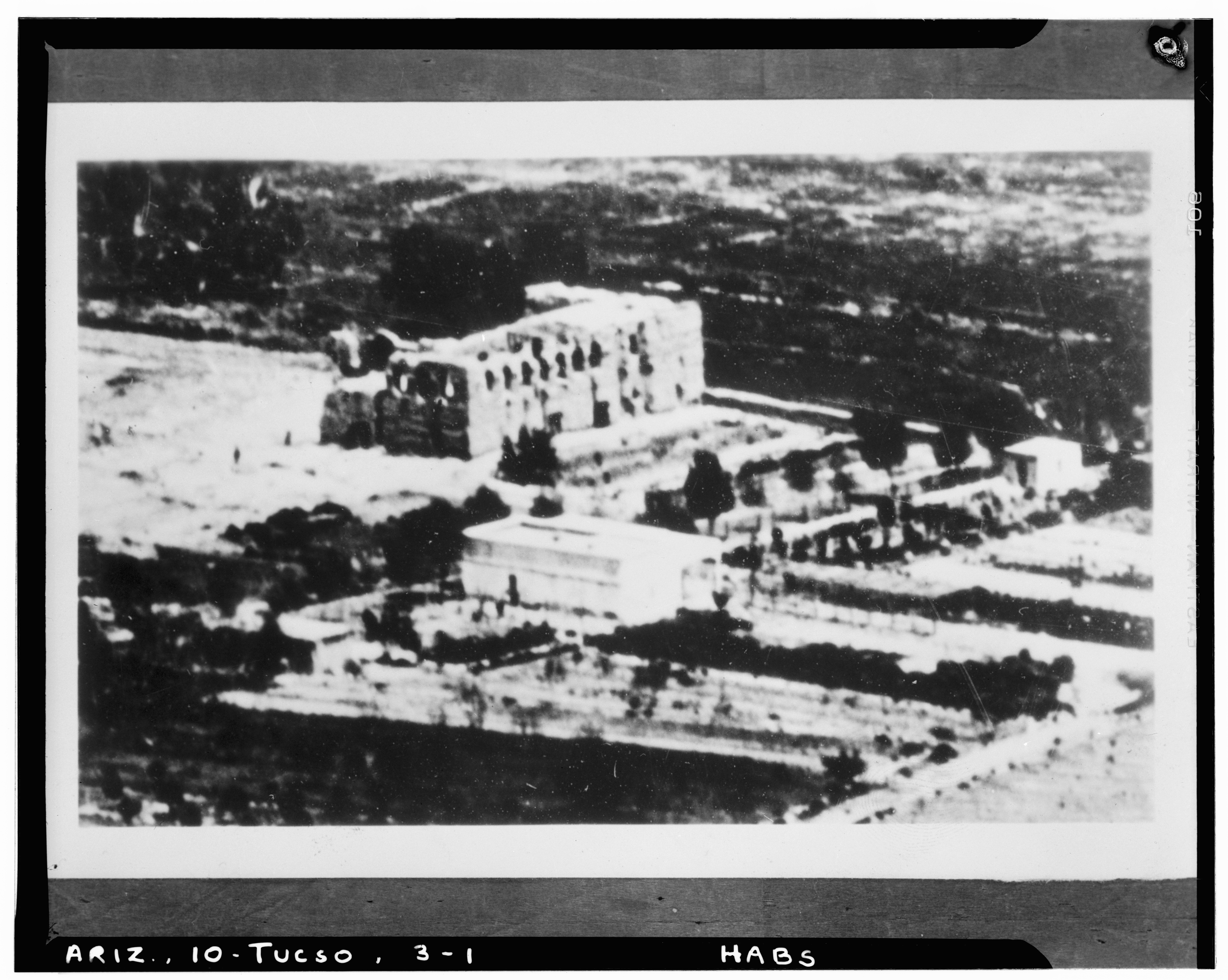
Mission San Cosme y Damián del Tucsón seen from Sentinel Peak, 1880

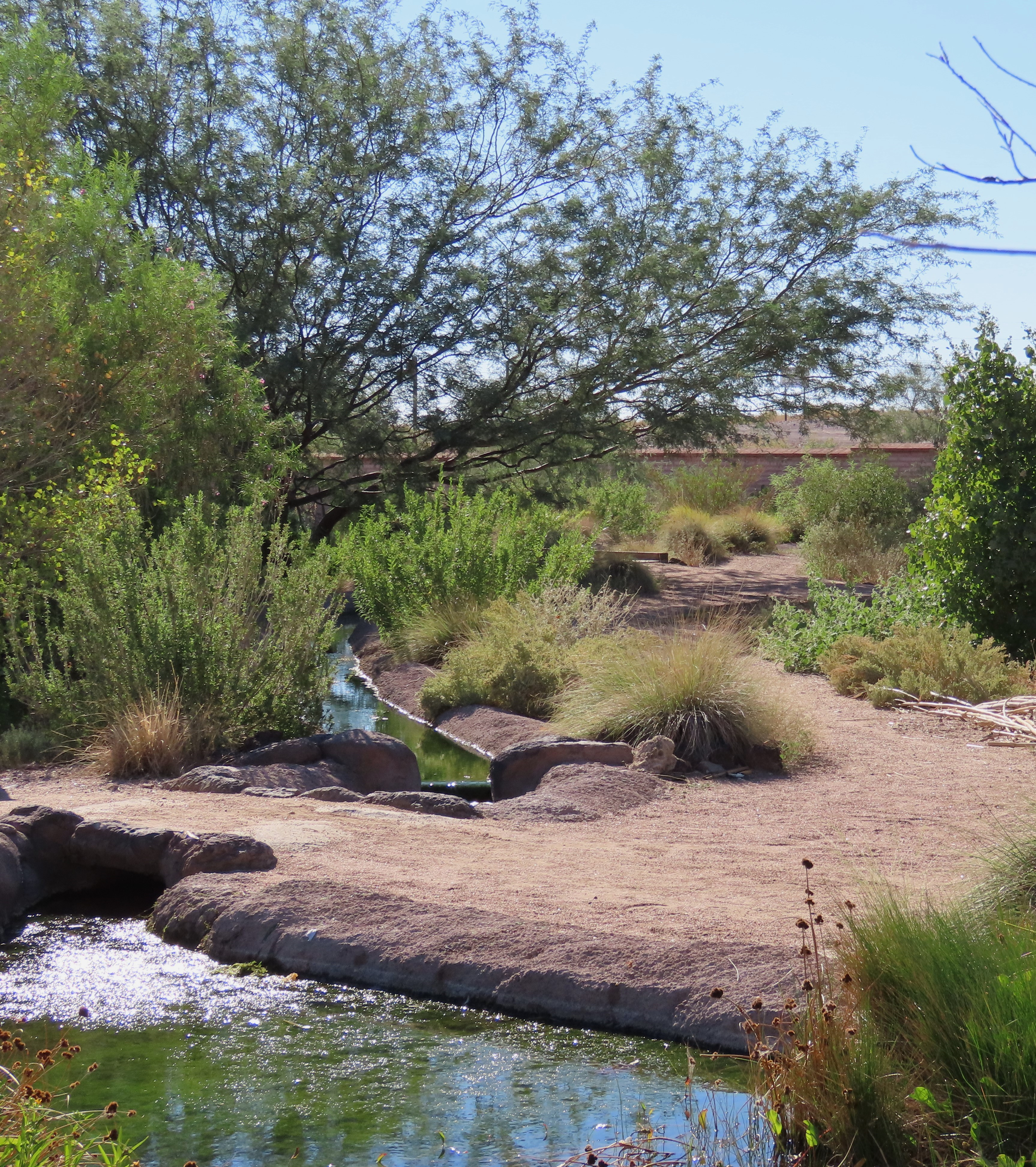
Model acequia at Mission Garden

A few years after his first contact with these O’odham people, Father Kino established near the Santa Cruz River a chapel visited by priests from Mission San Xavier del Bac. The older mission and the so-called visita chapel were about 10 miles apart. The visita would become the San Agustin Mission del Tucsón. It eventually had a church, a two-story residence for priests, a granary, tanning vats, a soap factory, a blacksmith shop and smelter, as well as cemetery areas – all surrounded by a compound wall. This mission was later called the Mission San Cosme y Damián. (See also Spanish missions in Arizona.) Mission Garden is located where the original mission's gardens and orchards were. Its Spanish Colonial area features fruits such as grapes, quince, pomegranate, Valencia oranges, peaches, plums, and apricots. Vegetables such as carrots, beets, and cardoon also represent the Spanish colonial influence, as do medicinal and culinary herbs such as caraway, chicory, garlic, and marjoram. Mission Garden's model acequia shows another way that the Spanish colonials influenced agriculture in the area.

Gadsden Purchase area in current Arizona and New Mexico

Another event that informs Mission Garden is Mexico's 1821 independence from Spain, when the mission system began to fail and Mexico claimed the area. In 1848, Mexico ceded the area to the United States; and in 1854, the Gadsden Purchase added the Arizona Territory to the United States. Mission Garden's Mexican and Territorial gardens represent this period. Tucson's growing population included indigenous and Hispanic peoples who had lived in the area for many generations before the Presidio San Agustín del Tucsón was established in 1775. The railroad arrived in 1880, which brought Chinese workers to the area as well. By the 1930s, the farms that these Chinese people raised food on had disappeared. Mission Garden's Chinese garden represents these influences.

Another influence on the area was the 1887 Sonora earthquake, which lowered Tucson's water table. Human factors such as overgrazing and pumping groundwater for agriculture and industry also contributed to the Santa Cruz River's decline. For example, Tucson Pressed Brick began operation in 1894, mining clay and firing bricks just west of the river. The company was an important employer for the region, and it supplied material for local buildings through 1963. But, its digging was detrimental to the buildings of the abandoned San Agustin Mission. Further, the farms near the river had become Tucson neighborhoods.

The land that Mission Garden occupies was part of a landfill that Tucson used in the 1950s and 1960s. This landfill included the bulldozed remains of the San Agustin Mission. In the 1980s, neighborhood protests stopped a four-lane road from going through the site. In 1999, Tucson voters authorized a new tax district to support cultural and recreational amenities and historic re-creations. A living agricultural museum was among several projects whose design and initial construction were funded by those taxes. The 501(c)3 non-profit Friends of Tucson's Birthplace shepherded the Mission Garden project over several years and continues to help fund and manage the place. Archeological research between 2001 and 2008 informed continued work on the Mission Garden site. (References in this article to Archeology Southwest's Fall 2018 volume summarize much of that research.) But the construction that had been started in 2008 was stalled by an economic downturn. In 2011, Friends of Tucson's Birthplace and Pima County entered an agreement to develop, operate, and maintain Mission Garden. Volunteers cleaned the area, improved the soil, and put in water lines. The first 120 trees were planted in 2012; the Kino Heritage Fruit Trees Project grew them from 17th and 18th century cultivars. Every year since then has seen additional work on various garden plots and special events.

== Grounds ==
Trained docents meet most visitors who come through the main gate. They review with the visitors a map of the grounds, pointing out historical timelines and thematic areas, as well as noting current and future events. Visitors can explore the grounds on their own or have docent-guided tours. Thematic areas are described immediately below.

=== Entry garden ===
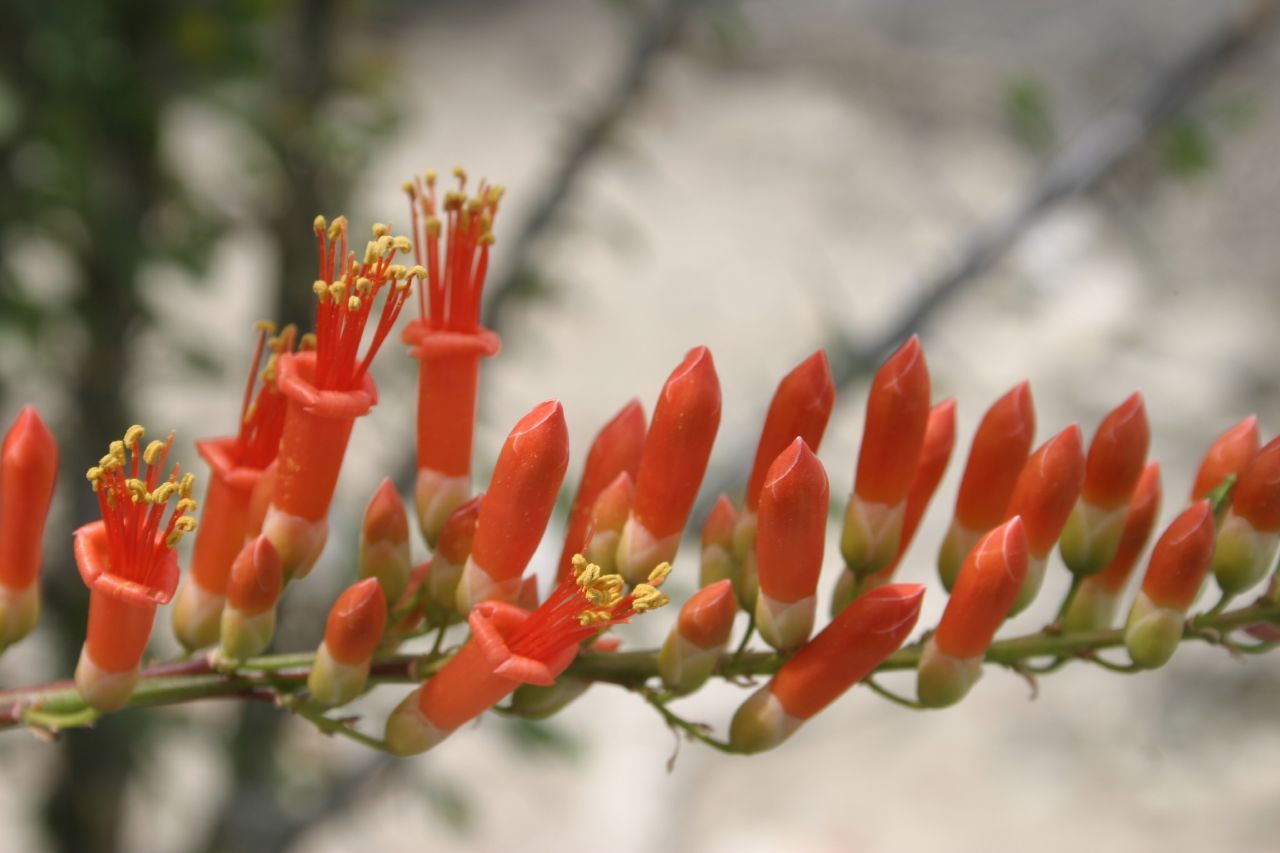
Ocotillo flowers

A number of native plants grace the path from Mission Garden's visitor parking area to the mesquite plank gates of the main entrance. These plants include trees that will eventually shade the path. Among them are desert hackberry, canyon hackberry, Arizona ash, and mesquites. Other plants growing along the entrance path include ocotillo, brittlebush, bamboo muhly, and Fremont wolfberry.

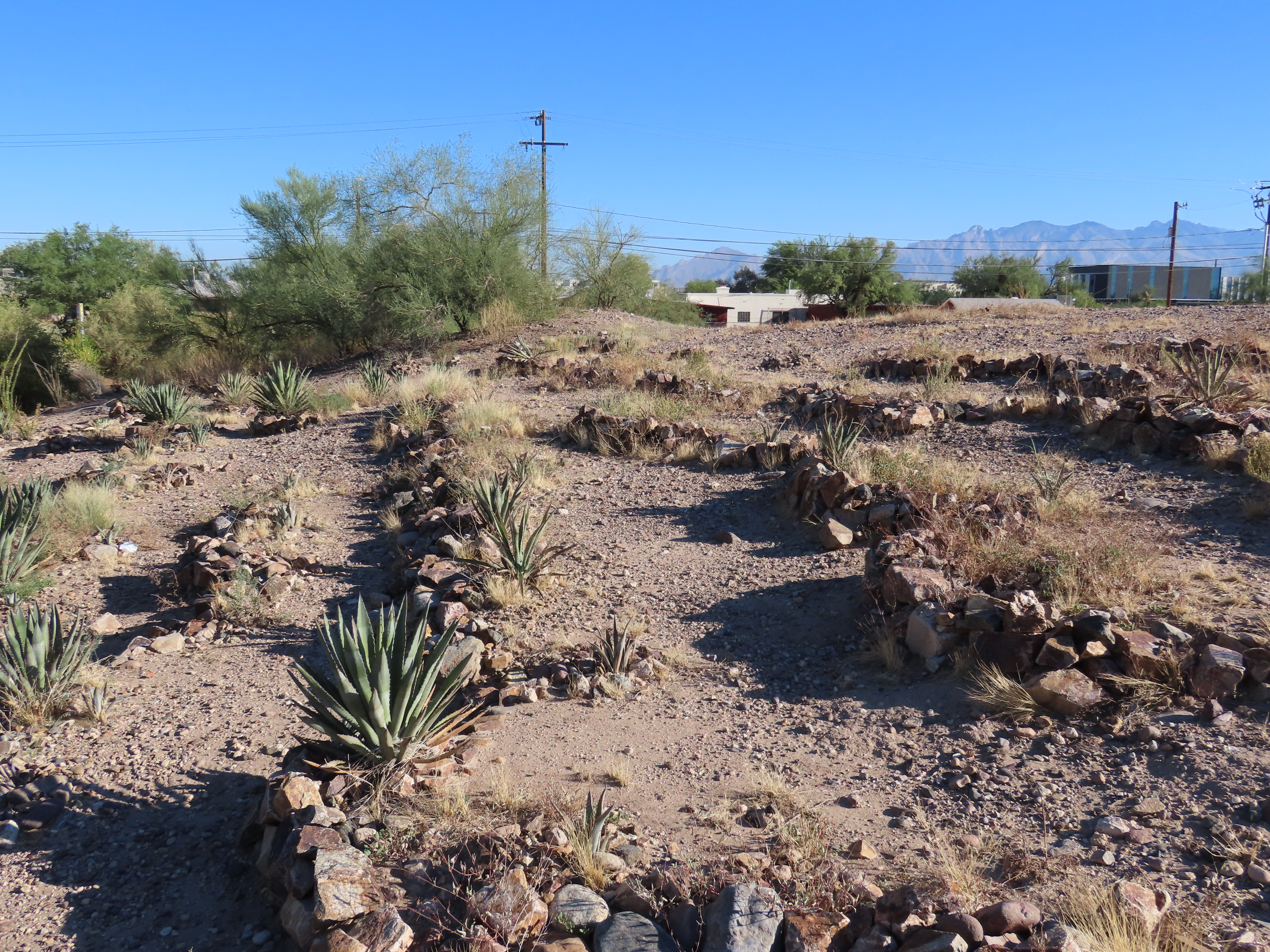
Agave trincheras by entrance path at Mission Garden

East of the path are hillside terraces showing a technique used by ancient Hohokam farmers to grow agave for food and fiber. Each plant is set above a pile of rocks that slows down run-off when it rains. These small retaining walls are called trincheras. Video by Justin Risley shows such planting during one of Mission Garden's educational events in 2021. Bat Conservation International and the Borderlands Restoration Network collaborated in this agave-planting event to support migrating nectar feeders such as bats. Archaeologists have found entire hilltops marked by trincheras, as well as stone tools for processing agave and pits for roasting agave. Such findings indicate the importance of this crop to these ancient peoples.

Because Mission Garden is next to a former landfill, trash was exposed when the soil cap began to erode. Mission Garden considered stopping the erosion by planting trees or shrubs, but that was not an option because of the trash. So, rocks were piled where rivulets were forming by the main entrance, and extra soil was brought in for planting agaves. These trincheras outside the east wall of Mission Garden thus represent a restoration of degraded land that avoided potentially hazardous contact with the old landfill, countered erosion along the entrance path, and improved the path with plantings that show this ancient technique for harvesting water in a place where rain is rare.

=== Spanish Colonial garden and orchard ===
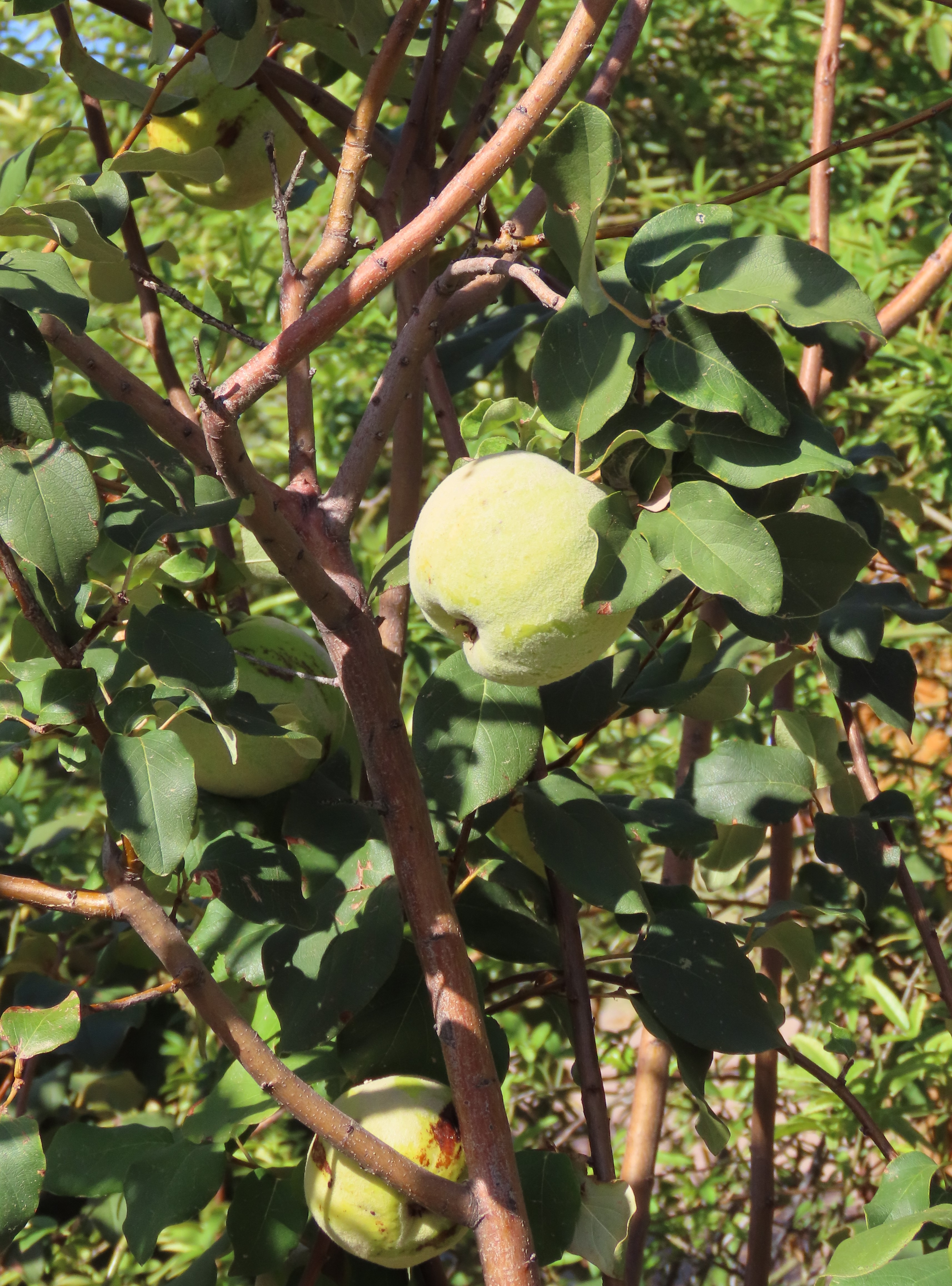
Quince at Mission Garden

Mission Garden's main entrance opens onto an orchard whose first trees were planted in 2012. Ethnobotanist Jesús Manuel García-Yánez collected these trees in collaboration with the Kino Heritage Fruit Trees Project. They represent those that fed the San Agustin Mission, the mission for which this living agricultural museum is named. As of 2023, the orchard grew close to 200 heirloom figs, grapefruit, limes, oranges, quince, pomegranates, olives, and stone fruit such as peaches and apricots. Many of these trees were propagated from older trees found in southern Arizona and northern Mexico. For example, the Sosa Carrillo cultivar of the Black Mission Fig came from a centenarian tree at the house where Leopoldo Carrillo and his family lived in downtown Tucson. Photographs from the 1930s show that tree, and the family's descendants believe that it grew from a cutting from the San Agustin Mission's orchard. The Kino Heritage Fruit Trees Project establishes the legacy of trees like that cultivar through such interviews, as well as by reference to accounts written 150–300 years ago, such as records for missions and mining towns. Originally funded by the National Park Service, this project finds and re-establishes cultivars or stocks of these historically important fruit trees. Mission Garden is one of several partners in this enterprise.

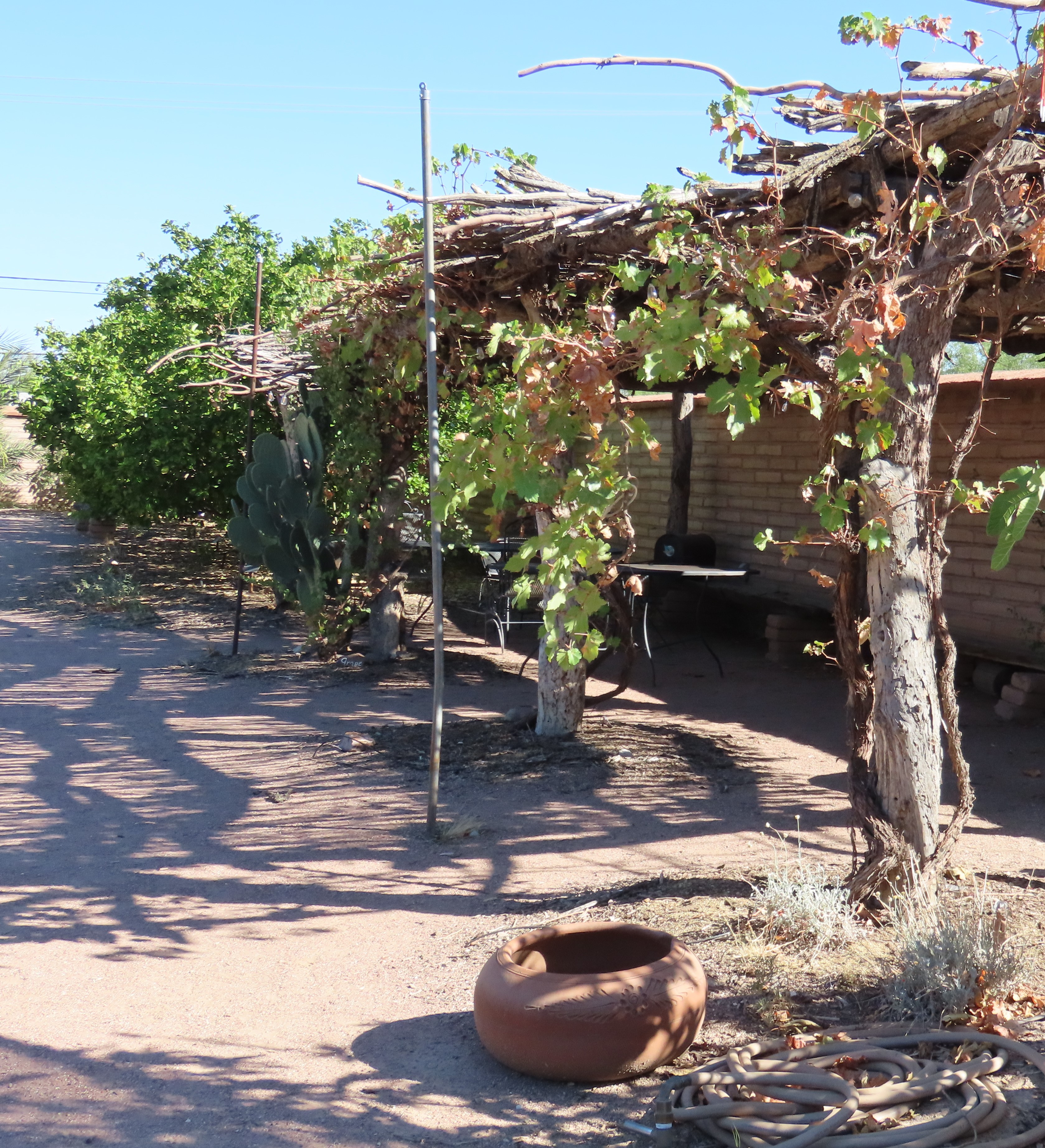
Canyon grape on ramada at Mission Garden

Mission Garden also has close to 40 heirloom grapevines of two historically notable varieties. Franciscan missionaries brought to the west coast of North America what is generally called the Mission grape, which they made wines with for their missions. Scholars determined in 2007 that the Mission grape is related to a Spanish variety called Listan Prieto. Mission Garden grows several cultivars of the Mission grape that come from arid regions. For example, the original stock for Mission Garden's Niagara grape came from Capitol Reef National Park’s Fruita Rural Historic District. The other notable variety here is the Canyon grape, which is edible even though it is small and seedy. Grapes are planted to show three forms of vine training: arbors, espaliered, and goblet (also called head training or bush training).

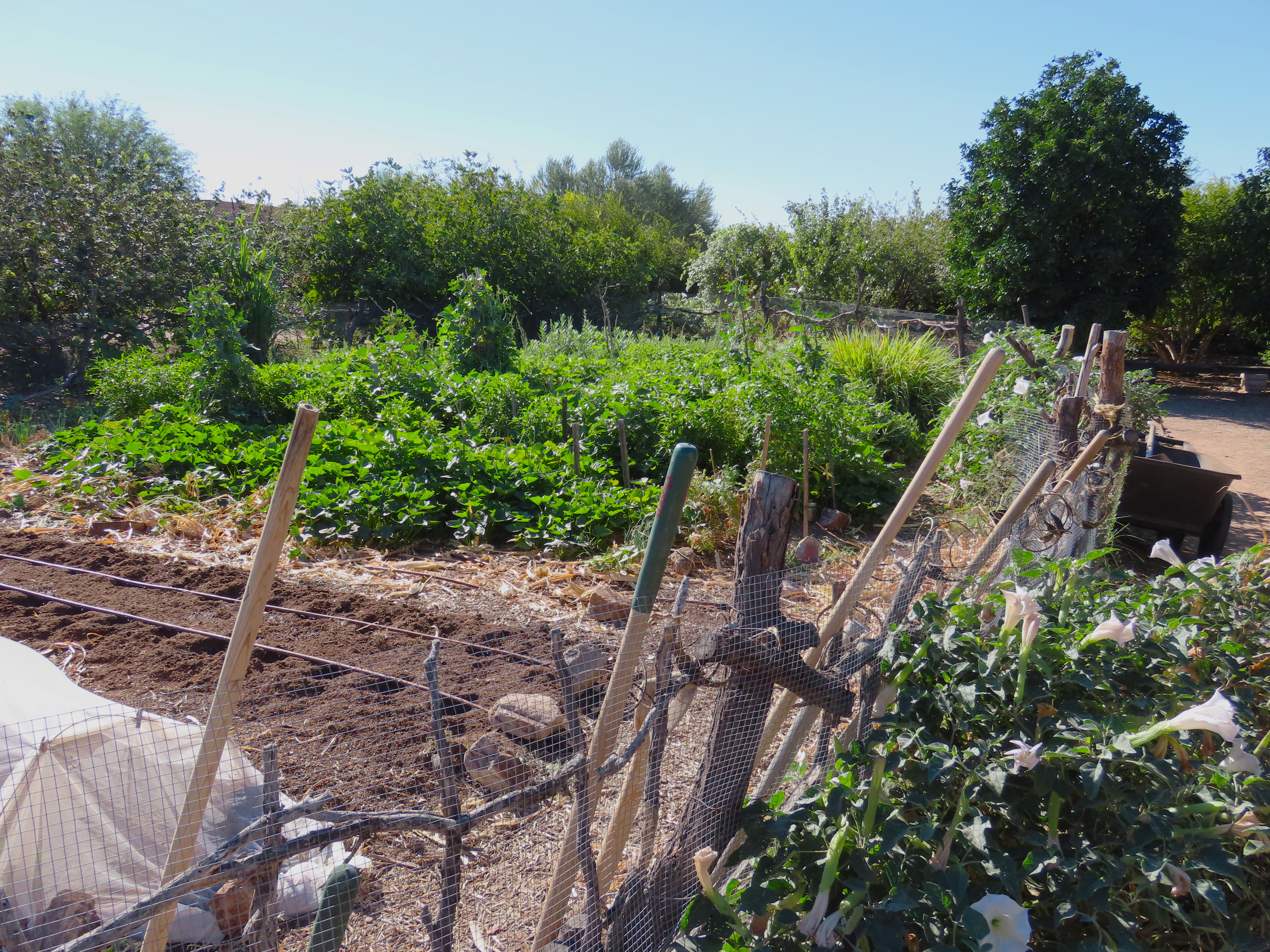
Mission Garden's Spanish Colonial area, fruit trees in background and wild datura on fence

The Spanish Colonial garden also features vegetables and medicinal or culinary herbs. They are planted as they would have been inside older Spanish orchards so that they benefit from the foliage and soil of surrounding trees. Mission Garden's choices here are influenced by letters that Jesuit missionary Phillip Segesser wrote home in the 1750s. His letters asked for seeds of plants like flax, turnip, carrot, beet, cauliflower, fennel, caraway, anise, sage, mint, chicory, garlic, celery, chives, and marjoram. Based also on gardening in modern Spain, the Spanish Colonial garden might also grow food like spinach, cabbage, artichoke and cardoon, fava beans, potatoes, leeks, peas, radishes, and carrots; and herbs like chamomile, calendula, basil, borage, dill, and parsley. Ornamental flowers also abound in and around this garden, adding beauty and attracting pollinators.

=== Early agriculture and Hohokam gardens ===
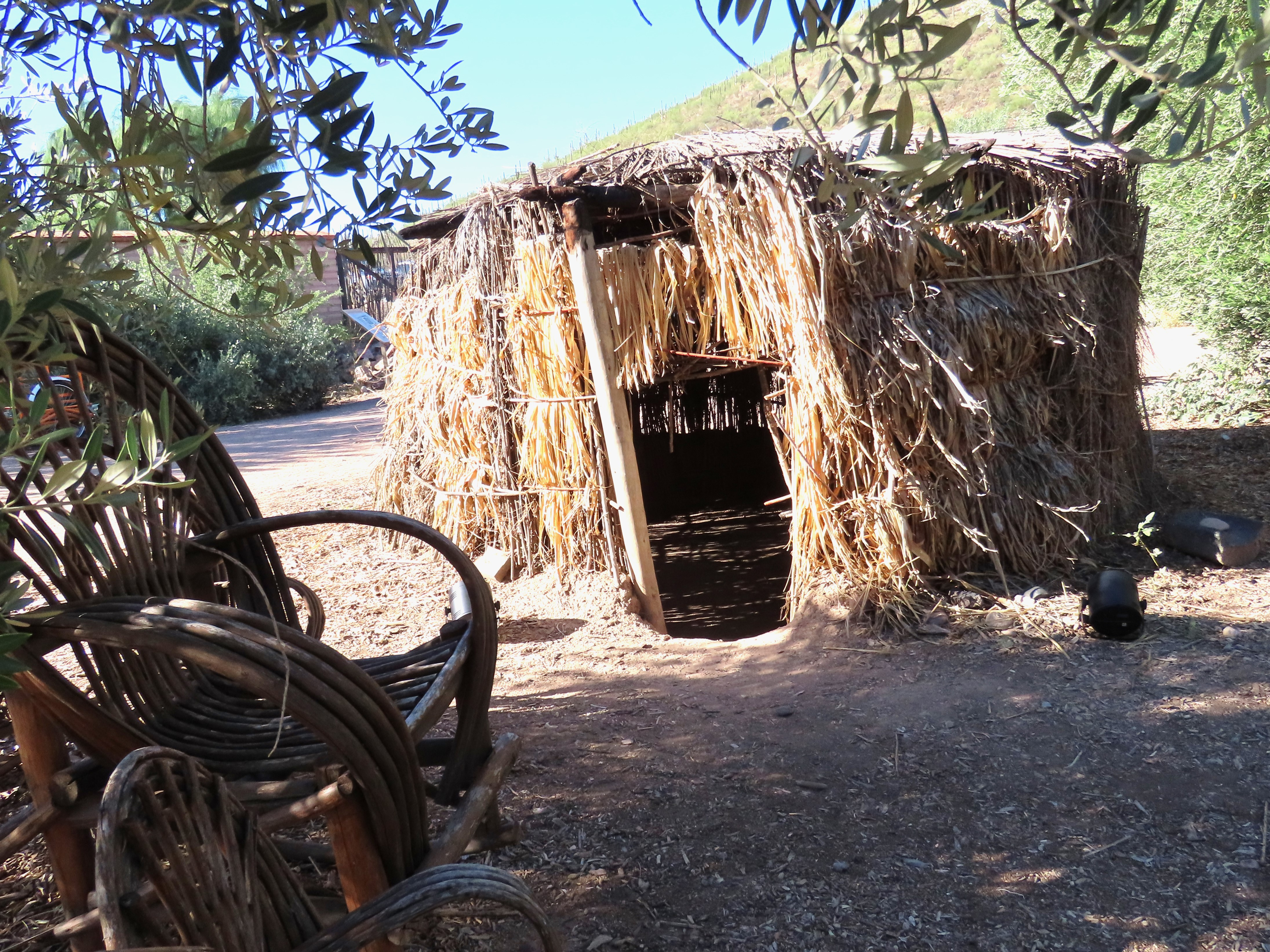
Reconstructed pithouse at Mission Garden

Archeological research has shown that people who lived along the Santa Cruz River millennia ago emphasized a foraging diet. Farming strategies appeared after 2100 BCE, the point when sites in New Mexico and Arizona show that maize had arrived from Mesoamerica. People in the Tucson Basin transitioned to bigger and more permanent settlements as the cultivation of maize slowly became more important to them. There is evidence by at least 2100 BC that the Hohokam used pithouses for living in, for storage, and for ceremonies. These early farmers populated stable, agricultural settlements in the Santa Cruz River's fertile floodplain, and used canal systems for bringing water to their crops. The archeological record also shows that the canals were expanded and crops such as cotton and agave were domesticated shortly after. At that time, Hohokam homes along the river were organized around formal courtyards, with groups of courtyards having their own cemeteries, agave roasting pits, and ballcourts.

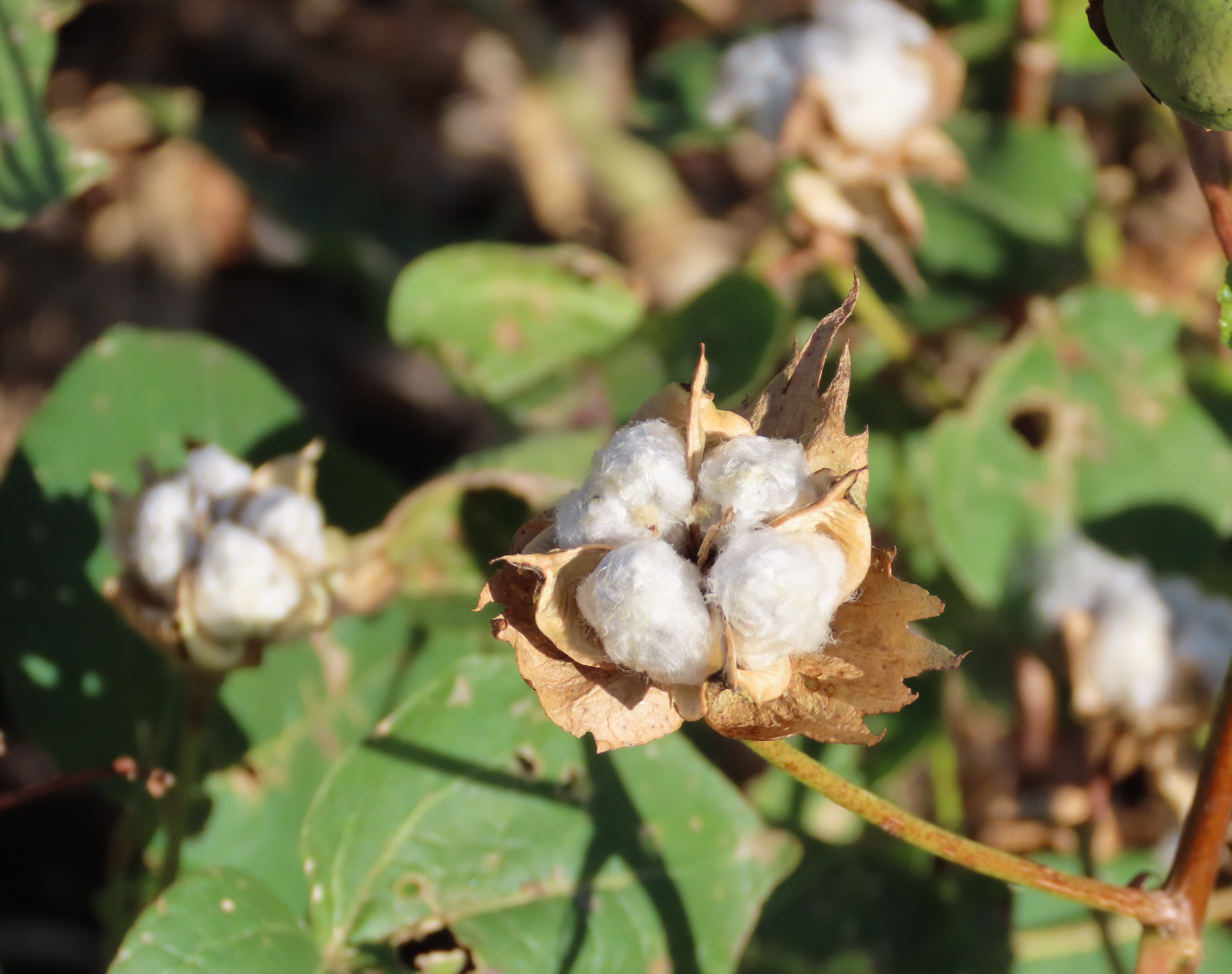
Wild cotton at Mission Garden

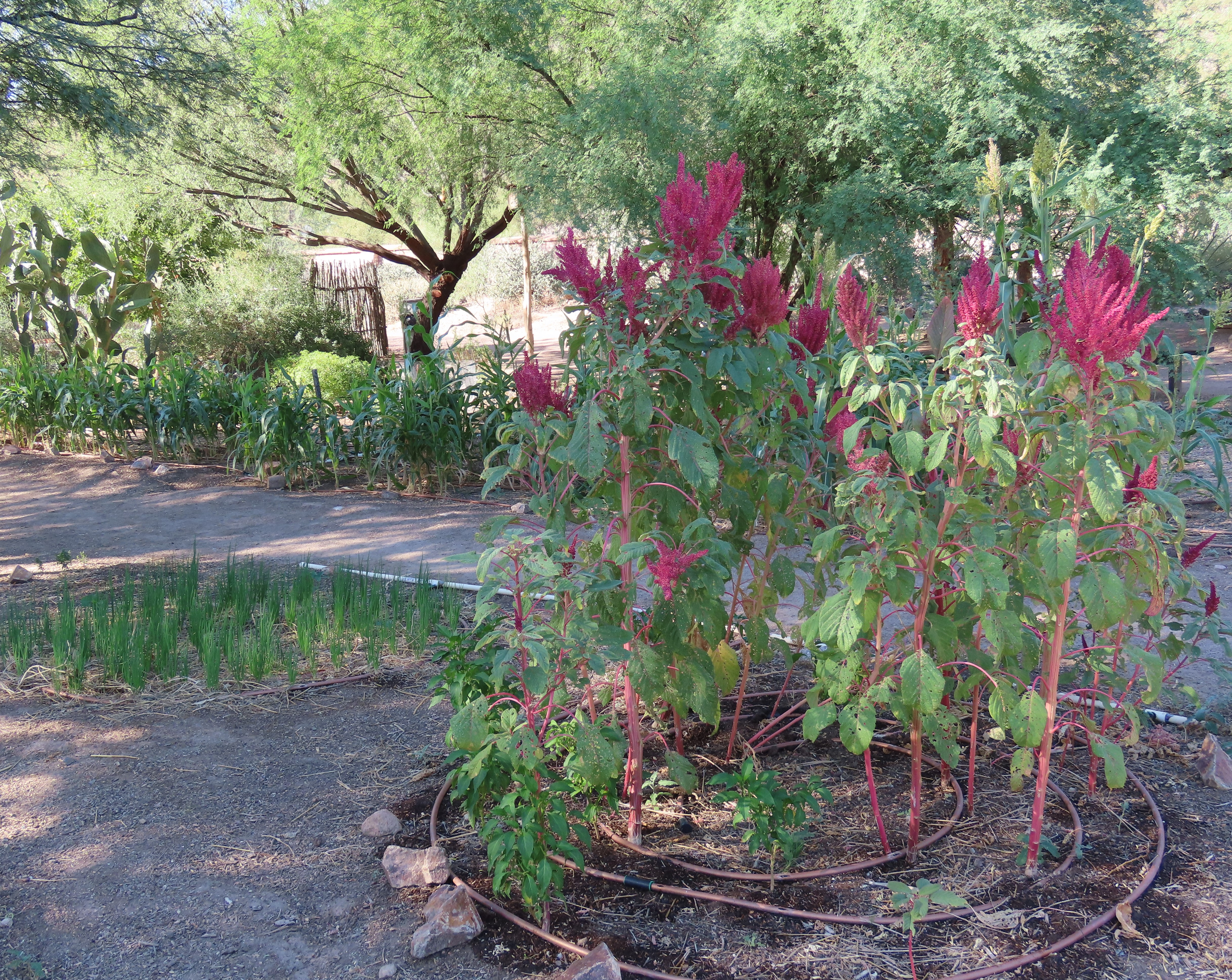
Amaranth, onion, and corn at Mission Garden

A small-cobbed variety of corn, as well as squash and beans dated around the same time, show that early agriculture here included the synergistic three sisters used by various Indigenous peoples across Central and North America. There is also evidence that this prehistoric agriculture included amaranth. To show variants of these and other crops that succeeded in this arid environment, Mission Garden grows food crops such as grain amaranth, cushaw squash, chapalote corn, tepary beans, and little barley. Mission Garden also grows both wild and domesticated versions of cotton. In addition to featuring crops such as those noted above, the Early Agriculture and Hohokam gardens also show farming methods that were used here.

=== O'odham gardens ===
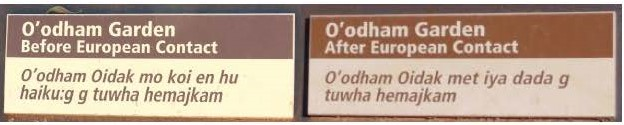
Signs for Tohono O'odham gardens showing farming before and after European contact

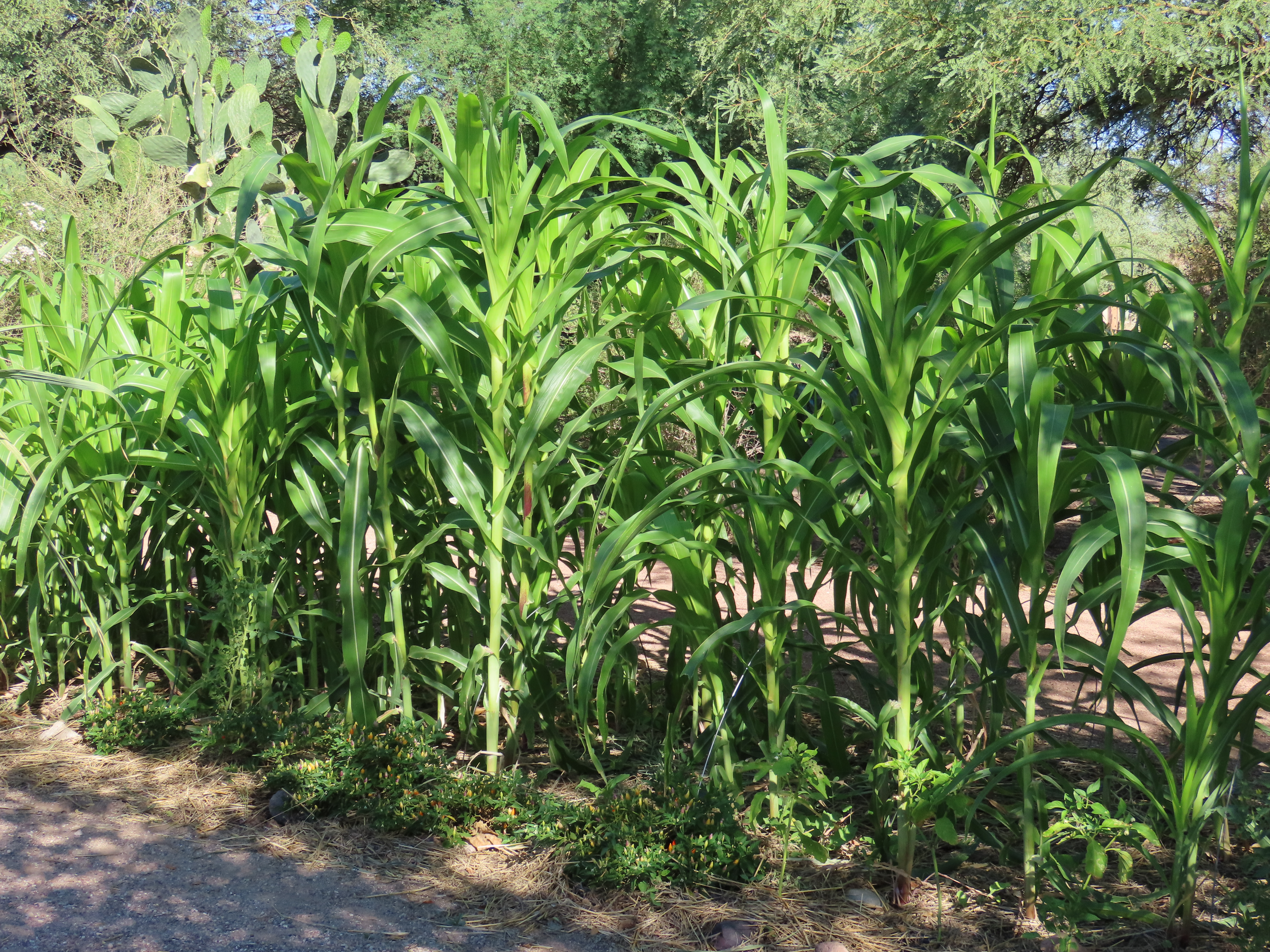
60-day corn at Mission Garden

Mission Garden shows the field crops that the Tohono O’odham farmed before contact with Europeans, when they relied to a large extent on monsoon rains and therefore emphasized foods that grow in warmer months. These crops include a fast-growing corn (ki:kam ku:n), greens such as amaranth (chuhuggia i:wagi), and tepary beans (bab:wi). A food-related detail that a visitor might learn in this area is that O'odham farmers compare tepary beans to the stars in the Milky Way. After European contact, the Tohono O’odham also farmed garlic and wheat. The White Sonora wheat is a noteworthy heritage grain now being used by craft bakers such as Don Guerra. In addition to pre- and post-colonial crops, Mission Garden demonstrates methods for cultivating such crops, as these methods also changed over time.

=== Mexican garden ===
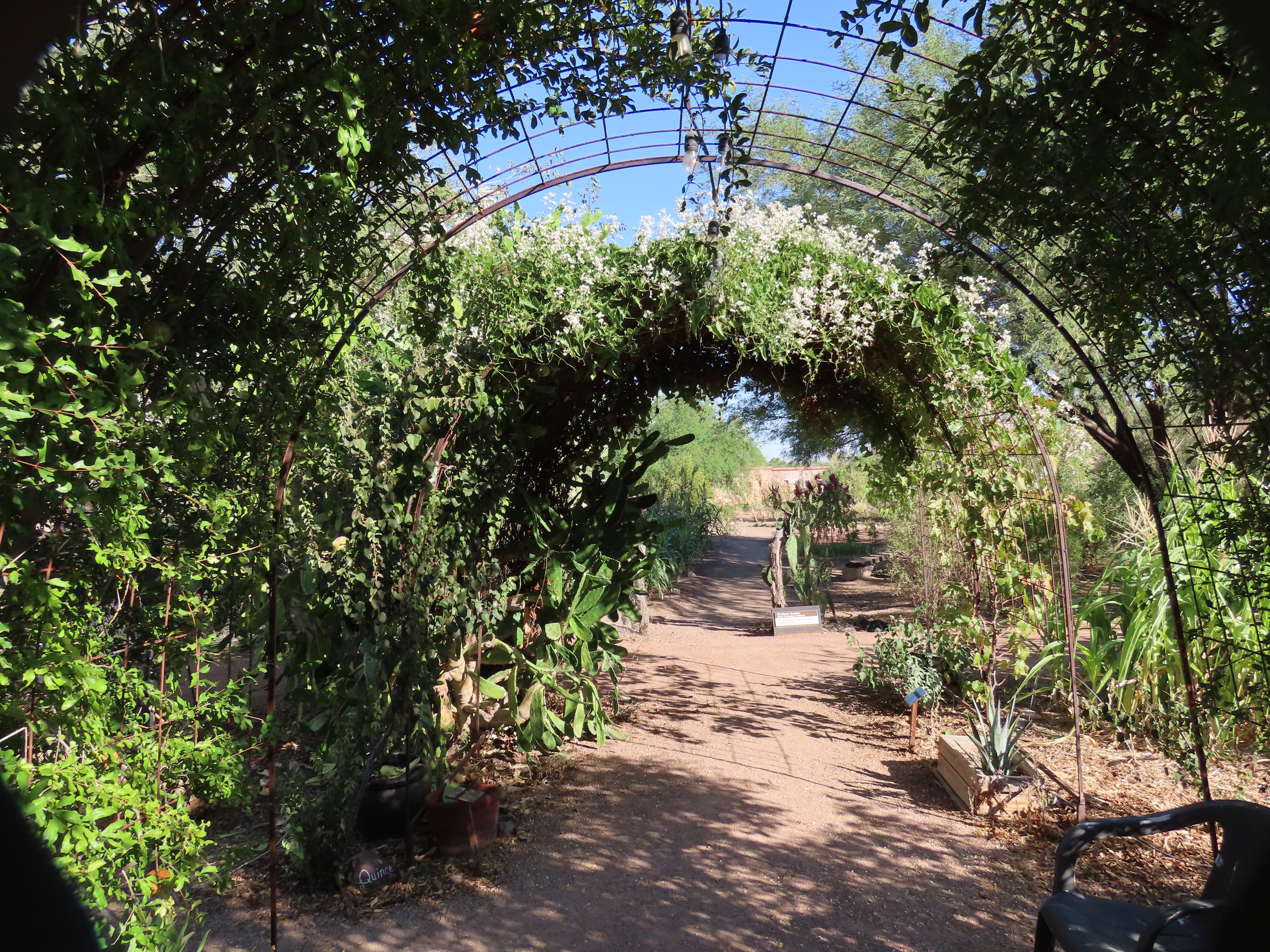
Arbor in Mexican garden at Mission Garden

To represent Mexican influences on food growing in the area, Mission Garden emphasizes a relatively short period around Mexico's independence from Spain and the purchase from Mexico by the United States of what is now the state of Arizona. It was a time when Mexican farmers grew some crops in small, irrigated fields or huertas. Each one typically grewe just enough food to support a family. Drought-tolerant crops such as winter wheat and barley were typical, as were beans, chilies, onions, and melons. Spanish Colonial canals or acequias distributed water to these fields. But the acequia-supported system of huertas collapsed as population in the area grew.

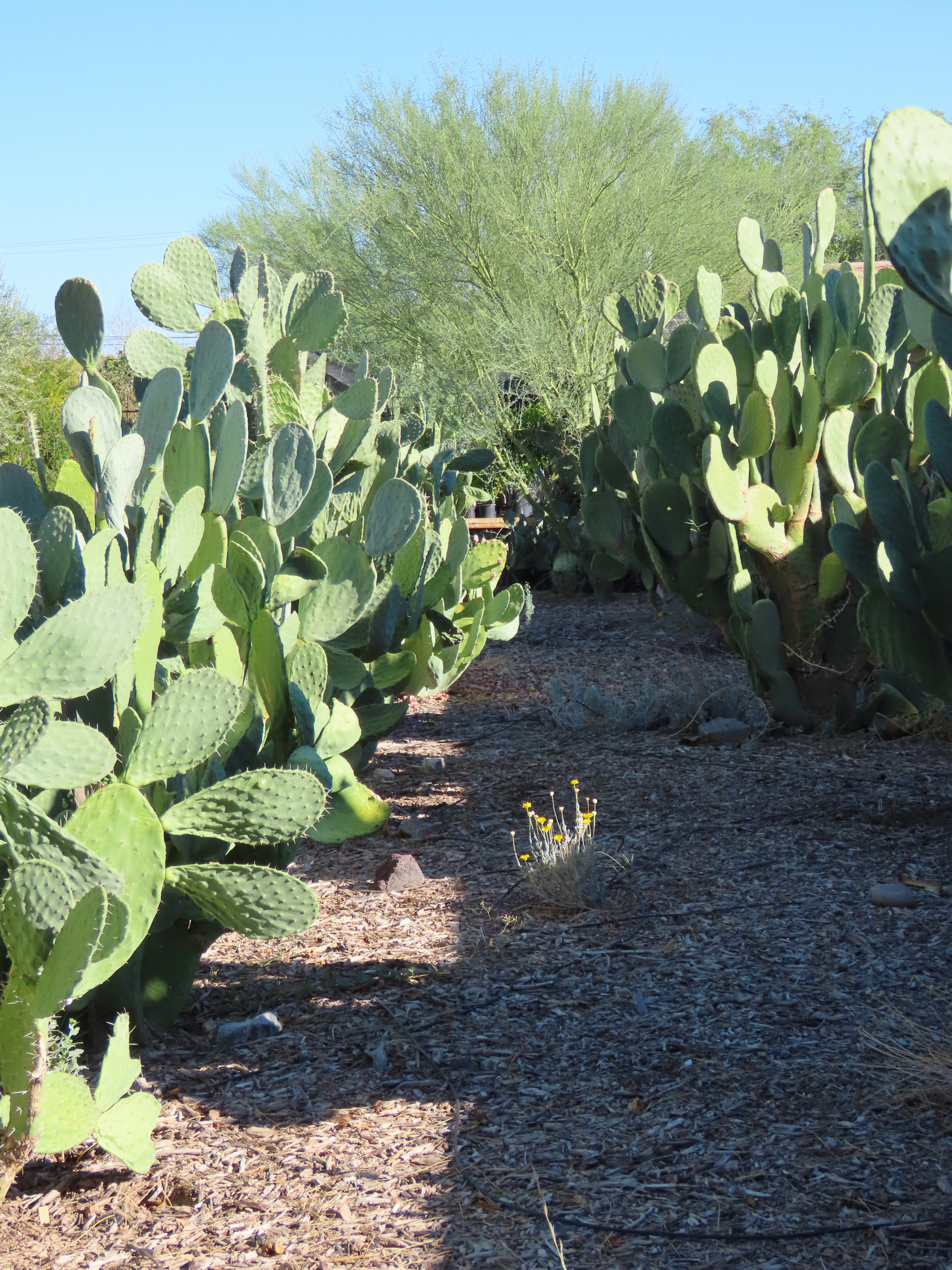
Nopal varieties at Mission Garden

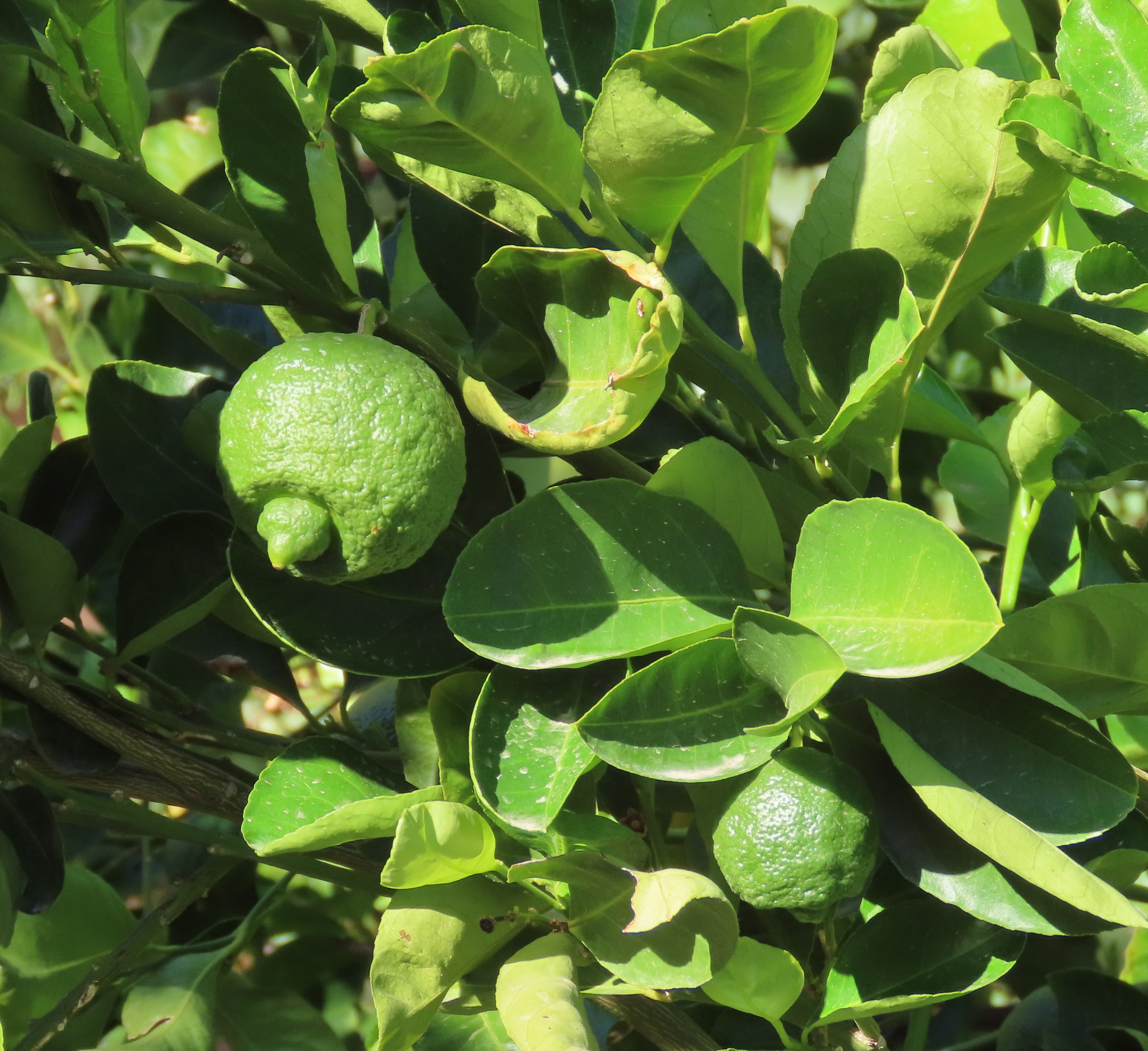
Mexican sweet lime at Mission Garden

Around that time, Tucson was a small town with dirt roads. Many people washed clothes and cooked meals in their backyards, activities that were often done under a small lean-to or ramada supporting shade-providing plants. Hispanic Tucsonans probably lived much as do the modern-day inhabitants of Magdalena de Kino, Mexico. Their small gardens would likely have grown corn (maíz), squash (calabacitas), fava beans (habas), chard (acelgas), and prickly pear (nopales). Culinary herbs such as rosemary (romero) and mint (hierba buena) would have been cultivated, as well as medicinal herbs such as rue (ruda) and wormwood (estafiate). Their fruit trees likely included Mexican sweet lime, quince, mulberries, and loquats; their flowers likely included hollyhocks (San Joséses), geraniums (geranios), marigolds (cempasuchiles), and hibiscus (hibiscos).

=== Moore medicinal garden ===
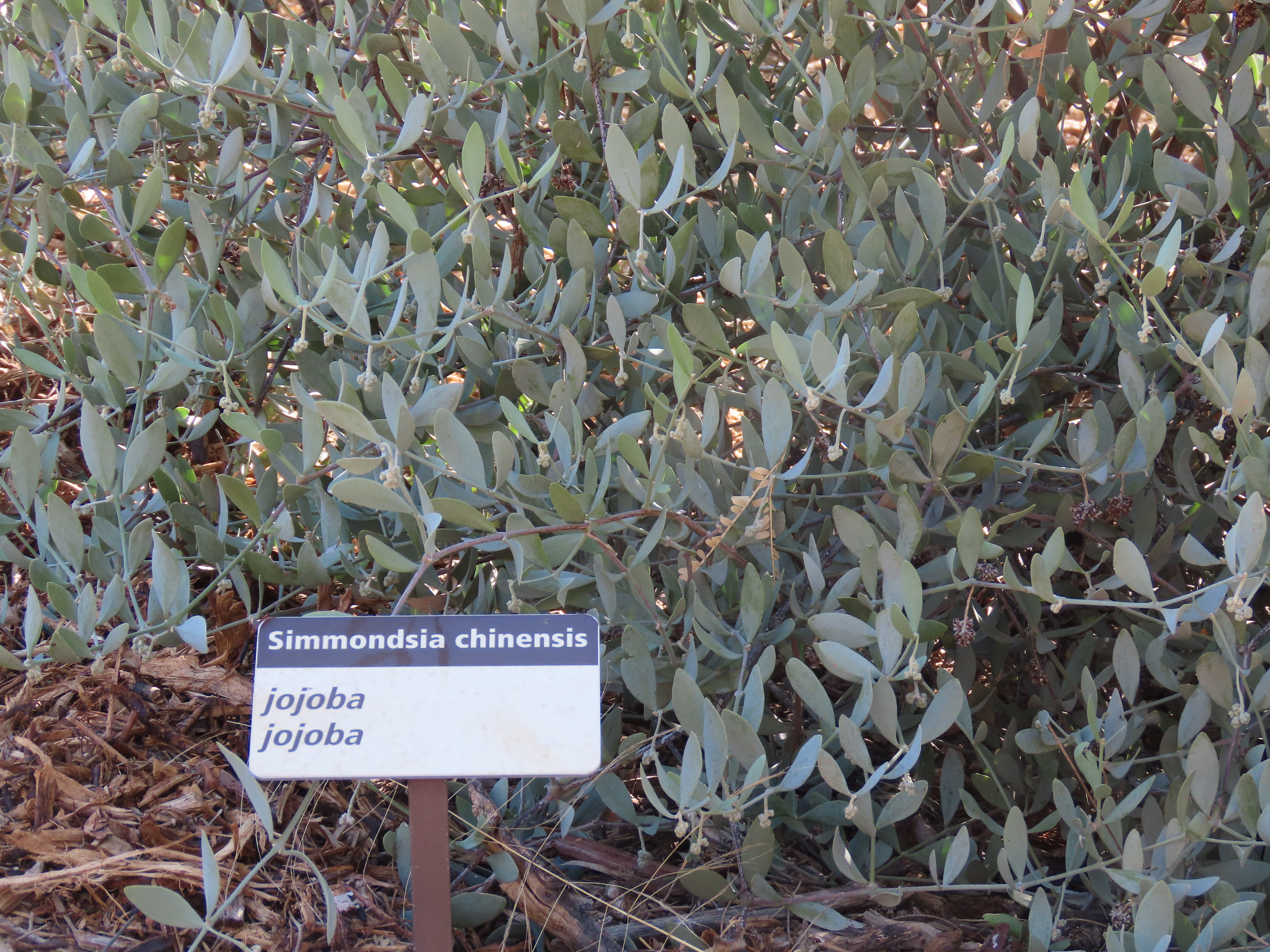
Jojoba in Moore medicinal garden

This area honors Michael Moore, an herbalist whose expertise included medicinal plants of New Mexico and Arizona. Mission Garden samples plants native to the arid lands of northern Mexico and southwest United States. Plants typically growing in this area include jojoba, wild tobacco, desert verbena, damianita, Western mugwort, Indian root, and Mormon tea. Because such plants are adapted to the arid environment and require little water, visitors are encouraged to consider them for both landscaping and herbal remedies. This garden is another place showcasing combinations of traditional and modern knowledge.

=== Chinese garden ===
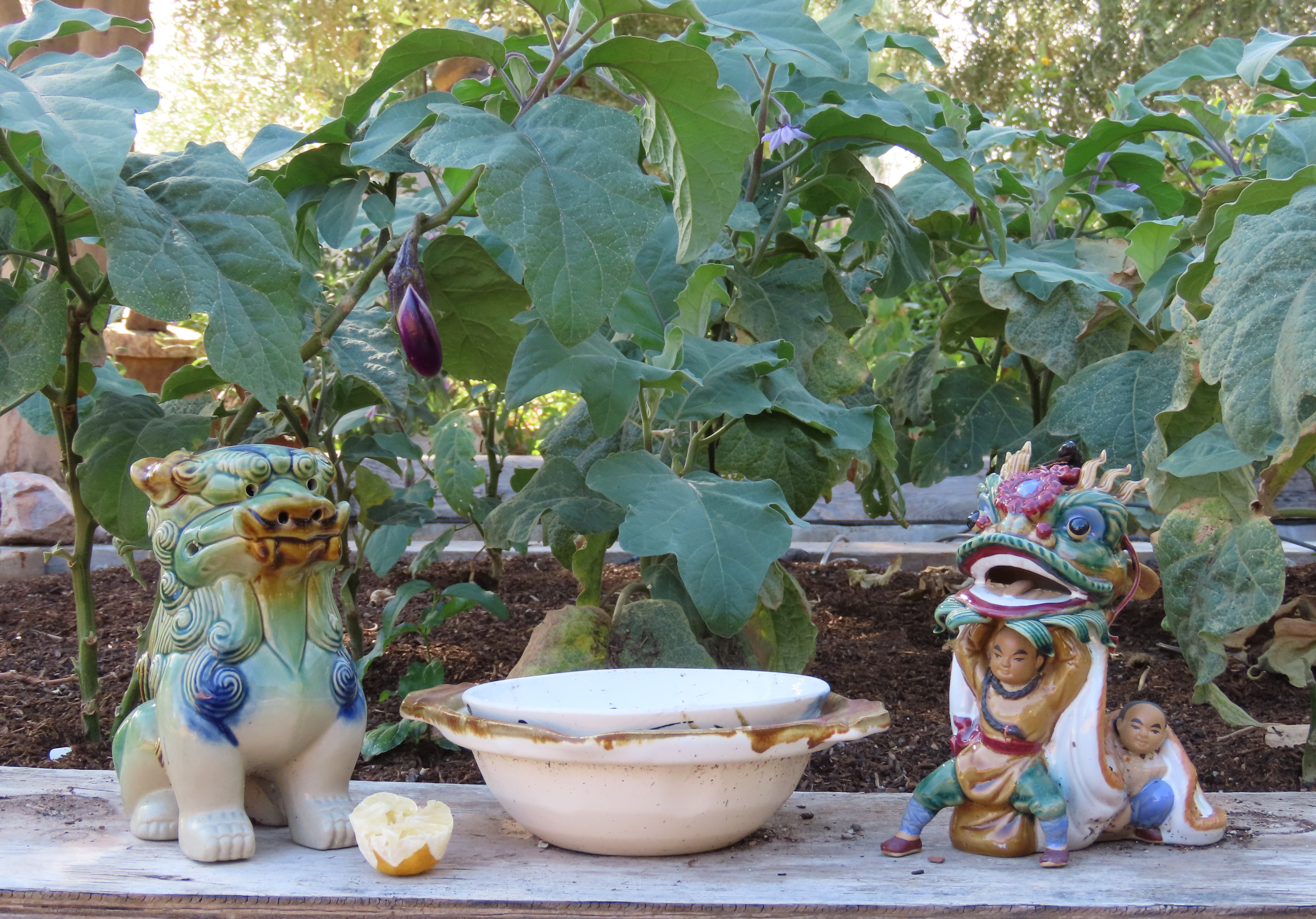
Eggplant behind shrine in Chinese garden

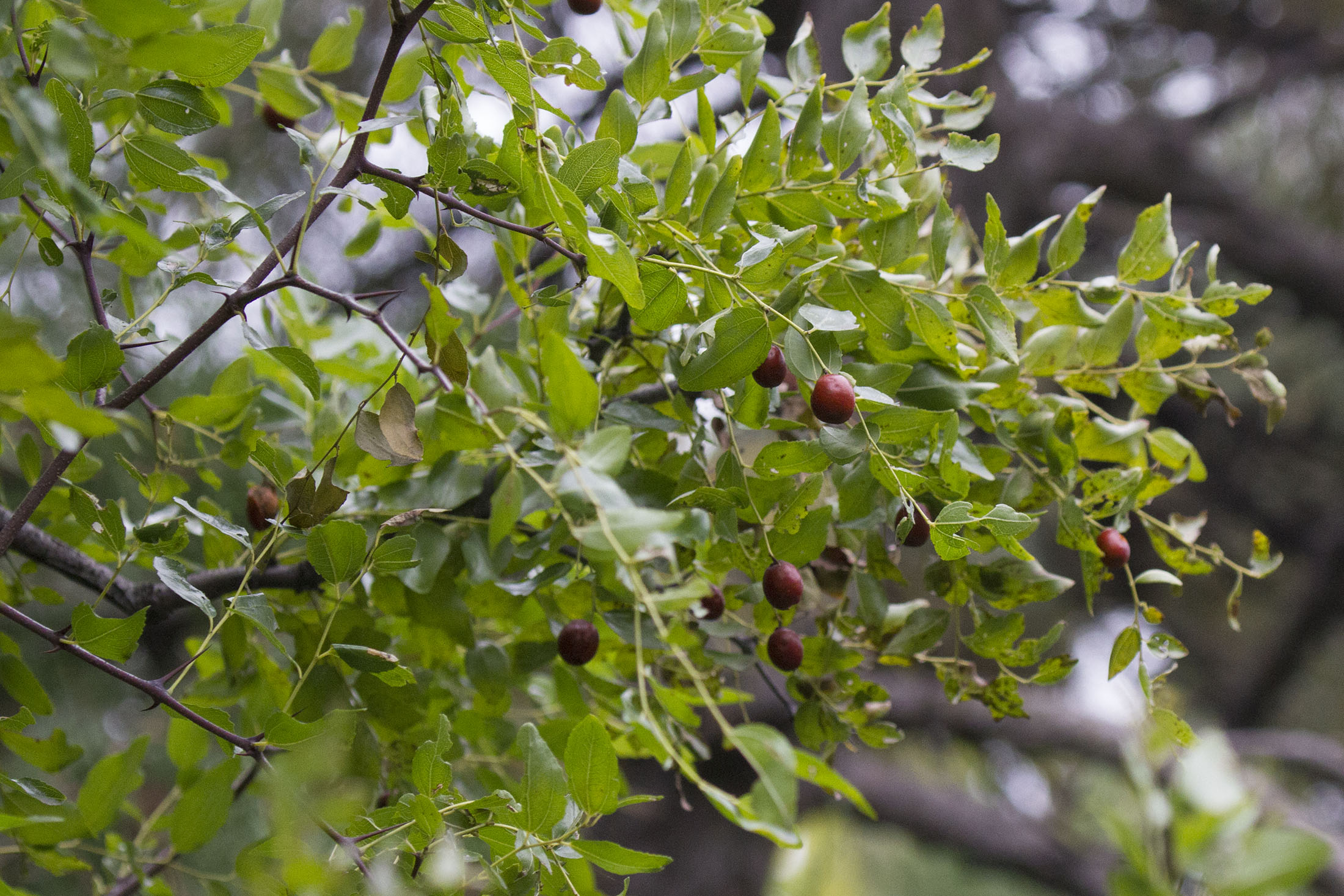
Jujube, sometimes called Chinese date

This area represents foods that Chinese Tucsonans grew between 1870 and 1930. Many of these people came from Taishan, in southern China, originally to work on the Southern Pacific Railroad and in mines. Some stayed in Tucson to work as farmers, growing and selling foods that Europeans had introduced such as strawberries, potatoes, carrots, lettuces, and spinach. They farmed small plots along the Santa Cruz River that they rented from landowners such as Leopoldo Carrillo. The Chinese farmers took their produce to town in wagons, keeping it fresh with wet gunny sacks. They sold this produce door to door, paying a percentage of their earnings to the landowners who they rented their small farms from. They also kept fruit trees such as apples, peaches, and jujubes. Foods that these early Chinese farmers grew for themselves included bitter melon (fu qua), long beans (dou jiao), and Chinese broccoli (kai lan). Mission Garden also documents the history of Tucson's Chinese grocery stores. There were 60 such stores in 1938, and 80 by 1974. Hispanic Tucsonans being their main clientele, the two communities developed an important symbiosis. The grocers kept gardens behind their shops to grow food for themselves such as amaranth (yin choy), winter melon (don qua), luffa, eggplant, and goji berries. They also grew orange, kumquat, grapefruit and pomelo trees, as well as stone fruits such as peaches, plums, and apricots. The choices in this area of Mission Garden reflect a collaboration with the Tucson Chinese Cultural Center that honors the legacy of the Chinese farmers who influenced the local food culture. Seeds that had been saved for generations were given to Mission Garden, for example, heritage bitter melons, luffas, long beans and garlic chines.

=== Z's garden of native plants ===
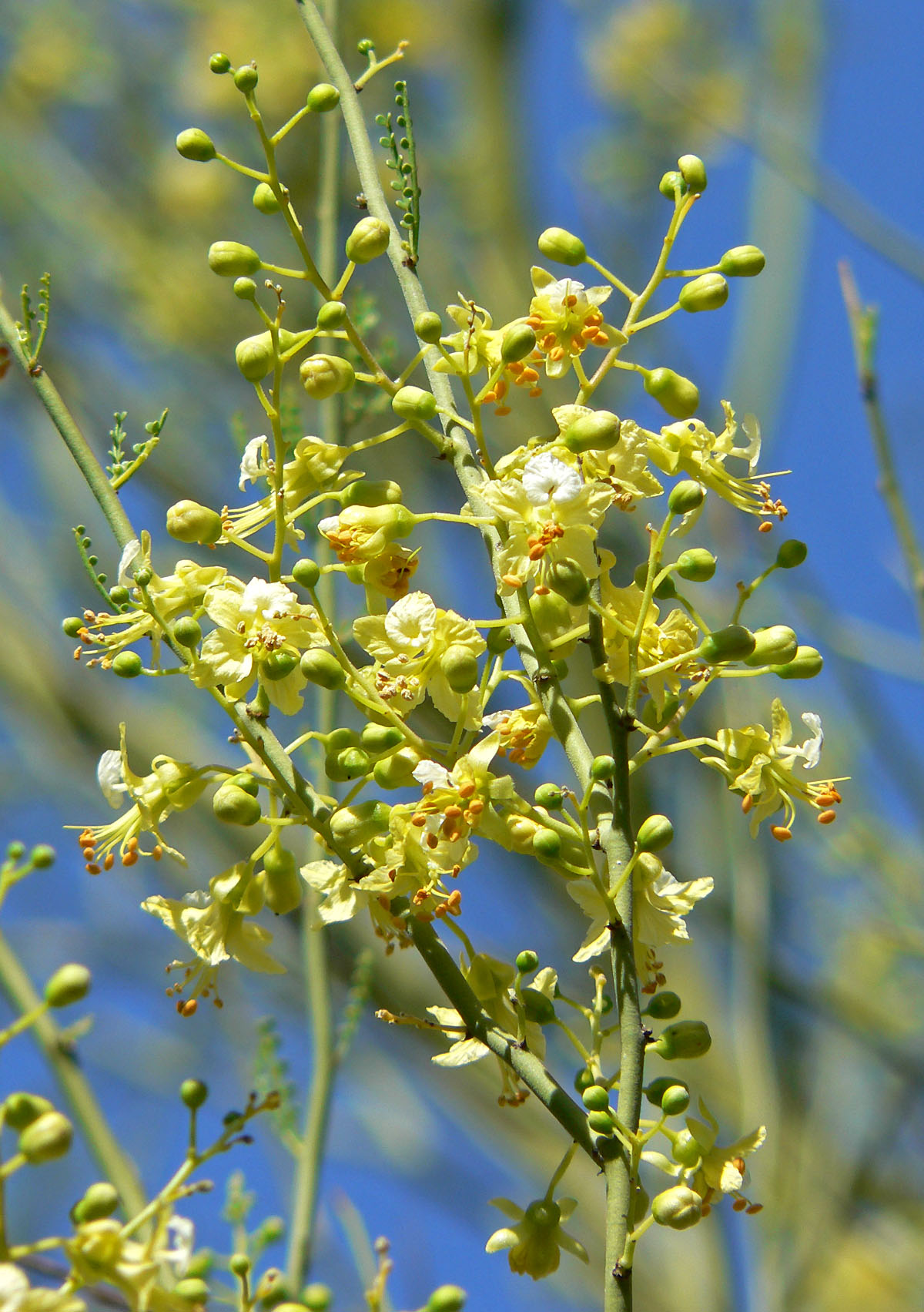
Foothills palo verde flowers

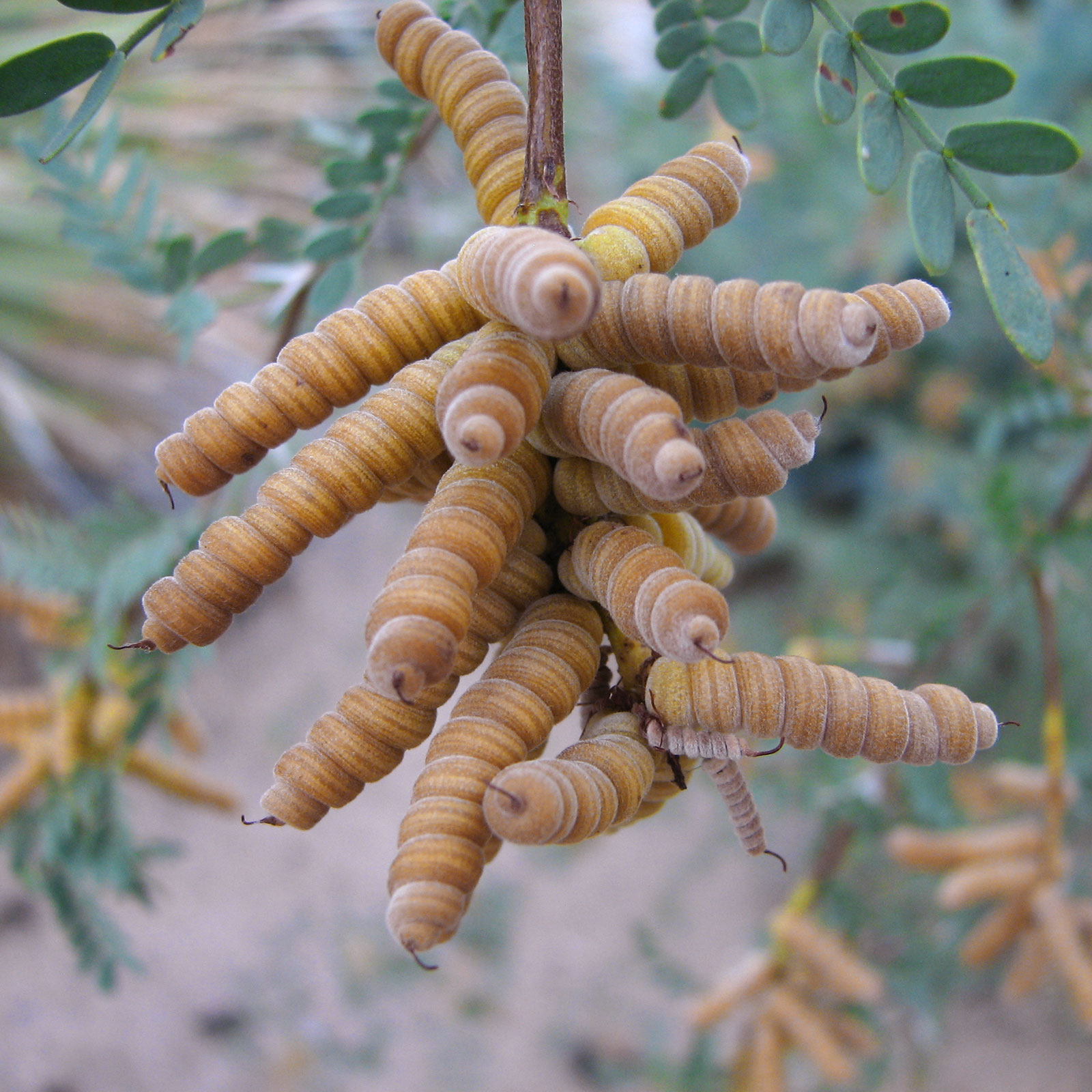
Screwbean mesquite

Mission Garden also features an area devoted only to native plants. It emphasizes wild foods that can be found in the Sonoran Desert. Visitors studying these plants might imagine what they would be able to eat here if they had to survive in this desert. Answers might include mesquite beans, cactus fruit, and agave. This area honors Nancy Zierenberg, who worked with the Arizona

Society for many years. The Tucson chapter of this society helped develop this area of Mission Garden. The plants in this area include foothills palo verde, ironwood, mesquites (including the screwbean), jojoba, wolfberry, whitethorn acacia, creosote, and many varieties of cactus.

=== Territorial and Statehood gardens ===
As of 2023, these gardens were still being planned. They will eventually explore agricultural traditions that characterized these periods in the history of Arizona. For example, because the state's early economy emphasized the five Cs of copper, cotton, cattle, citrus, and climate (i.e., tourism), cotton and citrus are planned for this area.

=== Yoemi garden ===
As of 2023, this garden was being developed in collaboration with local Yaqui or Yoemi communities. Yoemi people first arrived in the area along with Spanish colonists. Other groups of Yoemi came at the end of the 19th century to escape unsafe conditions in northern Mexico. The gardening traditions of these people include varieties of basil, leafy greens, corn, and wheat. This garden also features gourds that can be made into ceremonial instruments.

=== Africa in the Americas garden ===
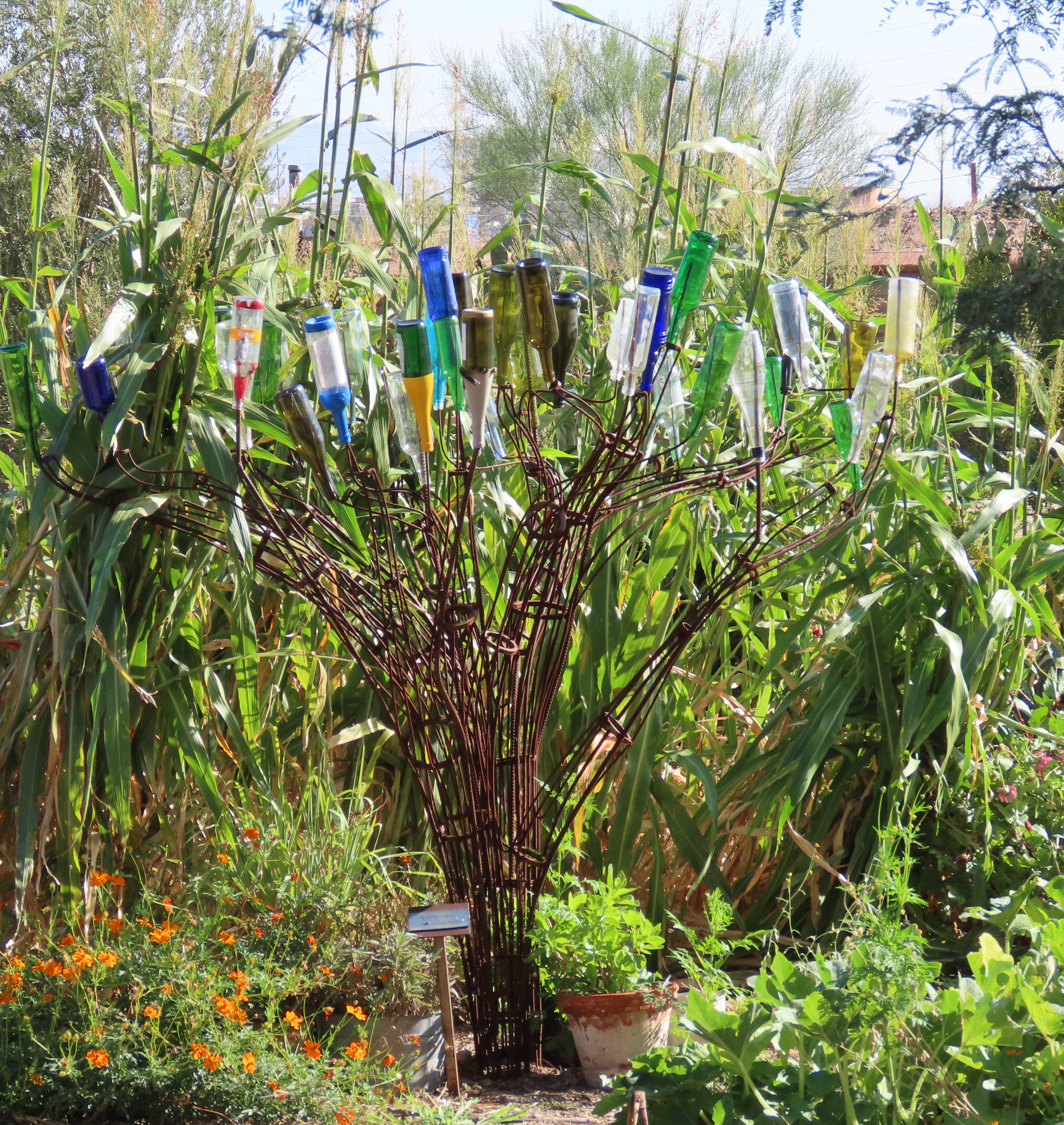
Mission Garden's bottle tree

People of African descent have also influenced the Tucson area for a long time. First, Estevanico the Moor visited the watershed that Mission Garden celebrates back in 1539. The expedition of Juan Bautista de Anza also included people of African descent. This expedition went from Tubac Presidio to Monterey, California, and back again to Tubac in 1774. Among the soldiers who established the Presidio San Agustín del Tucsón in 1775 were four people of African descent. Later arriving Black settlers brought their gardening practices and modified them to succeed in the desert. For example, grains such as sorghum and millet that are native to Africa could grow in the Sonoran Desert. But rice, which is also an African staple, needs more water than the region provides. In part because of isolation from other groups of people, these people's gardening practices had to be self-sustaining all year long. Mission Garden honors these early practices by growing greens like collards, mustards, and spinach, as well as root crops such as onions and carrots. Melons, gourds, cowpeas, and moringa can also handle arid environments and likely contributed to this diet. Two design details in this garden are of particular interest: First, the garden takes the shape of the continent of Africa. Second, the garden has a bottle tree representing traditions from western and central Africa, where glass bottles are sometimes used to deflect or attract spirits. Many of the bottles in this tree were found during Mission Garden's development.

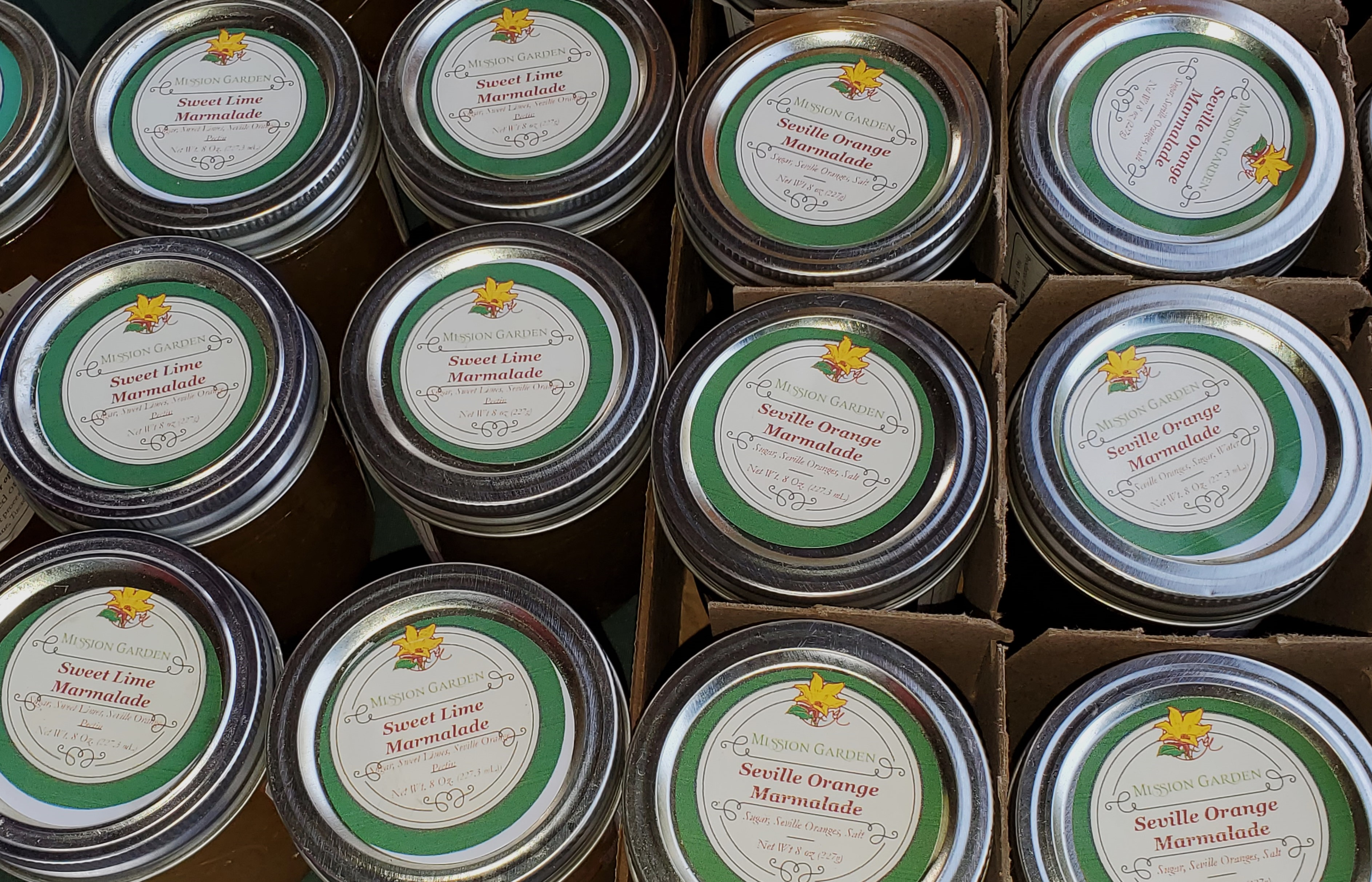
Mission Garden marmalades

=== Structures in Mission Garden ===
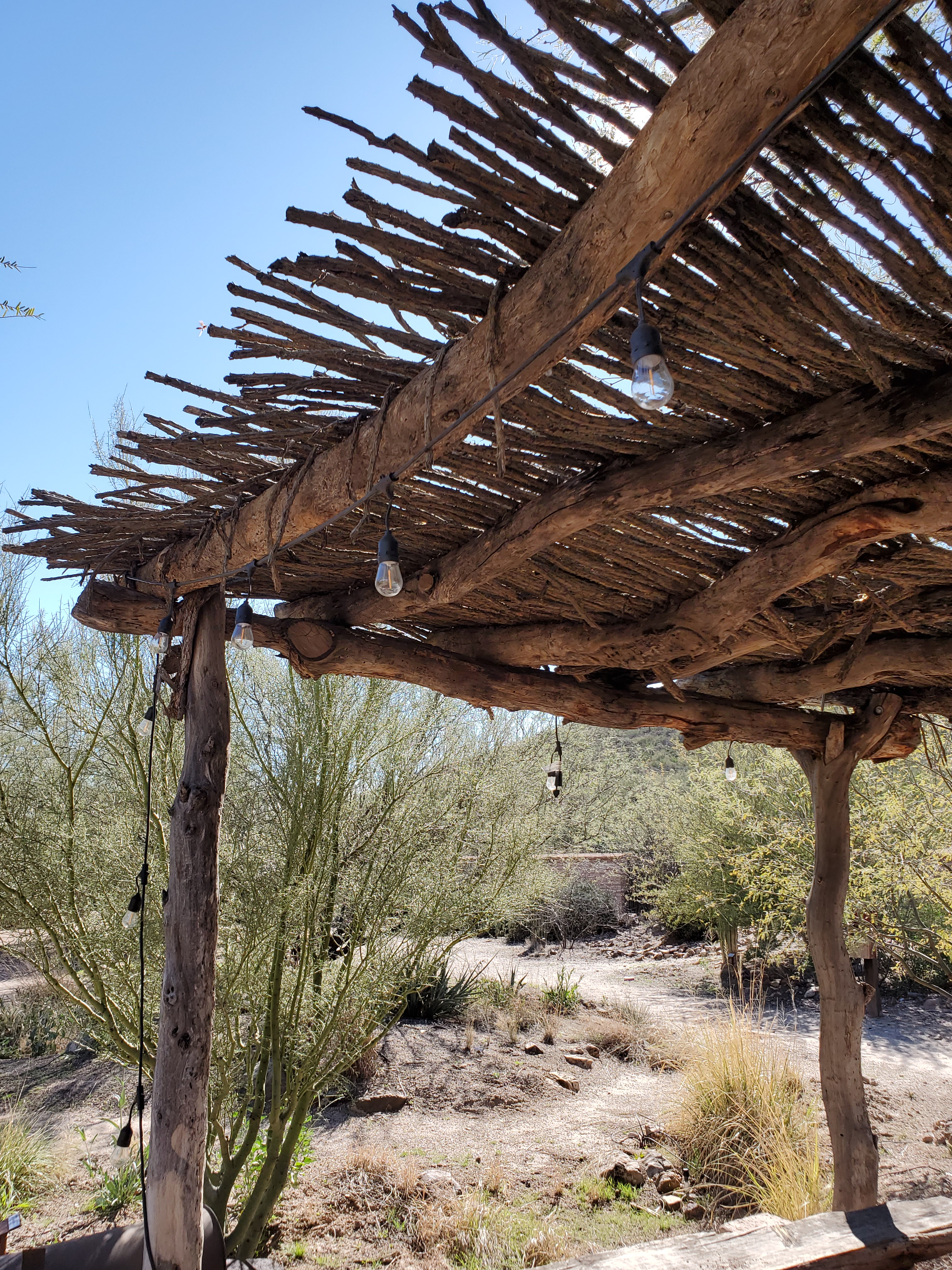
One of several ocotillo ramadas at Mission Garden

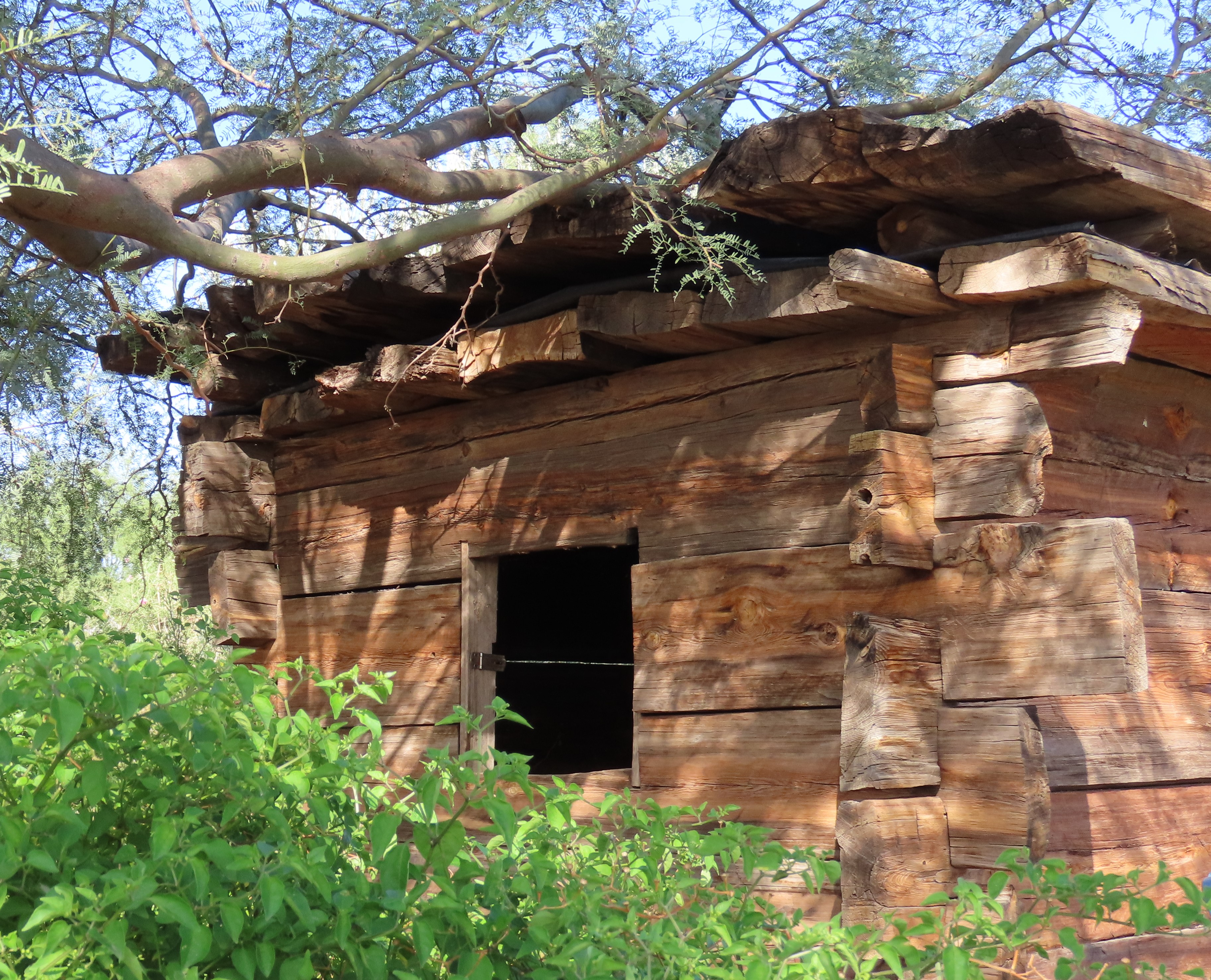
Tarahumara granary at Mission Garden, chiltepin in foreground

To the left of the main entrance is an adobe brick building with a porch made of ocotillo branches. This area functions mainly as a gift shop and a repository for information that typically interests visitors. Resources there include, for example, extensive plant descriptions and summaries of the archeological research that informed Mission Garden's establishment. (Mission Garden's website includes an alphabetically organized list of its plants. The locations where each plant can be found are also given.) A number of free-standing ramadas and arbors are scattered around the grounds, where visitors can find shade and places to sit. Restrooms are located on the east side of a professional kitchen. The kitchen is for preparing foods that feature Mission Garden's produce. For example, the gift shop sells orange, grapefruit, and lime marmalades, and the San Ysidro Festival shares pozole de trigo (a soup from Mexican cuisine that can be made with hominy or wheat). A reconstructed pithouse was built by middle and high school students in a project led by experimental archeologist Allen Denoyer. This replica was based on a pithouse floor that was excavated during Mission Garden's development. Mission Garden also has a granary and a chicken coop; these small buildings were originally a gift to the Arizona State Museum from the Tarahumara of Mexico. A general purpose building has staff offices, a library, and indoor meeting space that is used for some educational events. There are also special areas that directly support the gardening, such as greenhouses and tool sheds. Finally, a 72-foot-long, 6-foot-high wall runs between Mission Garden's West wall and Grande Road. The wall is made of ByFusion blocks, which are made from shredded and then fused plastic waste. This wall has murals that were painted by teenagers from the Boys and Girls Club's Pascua Yaqui Clubhouse.

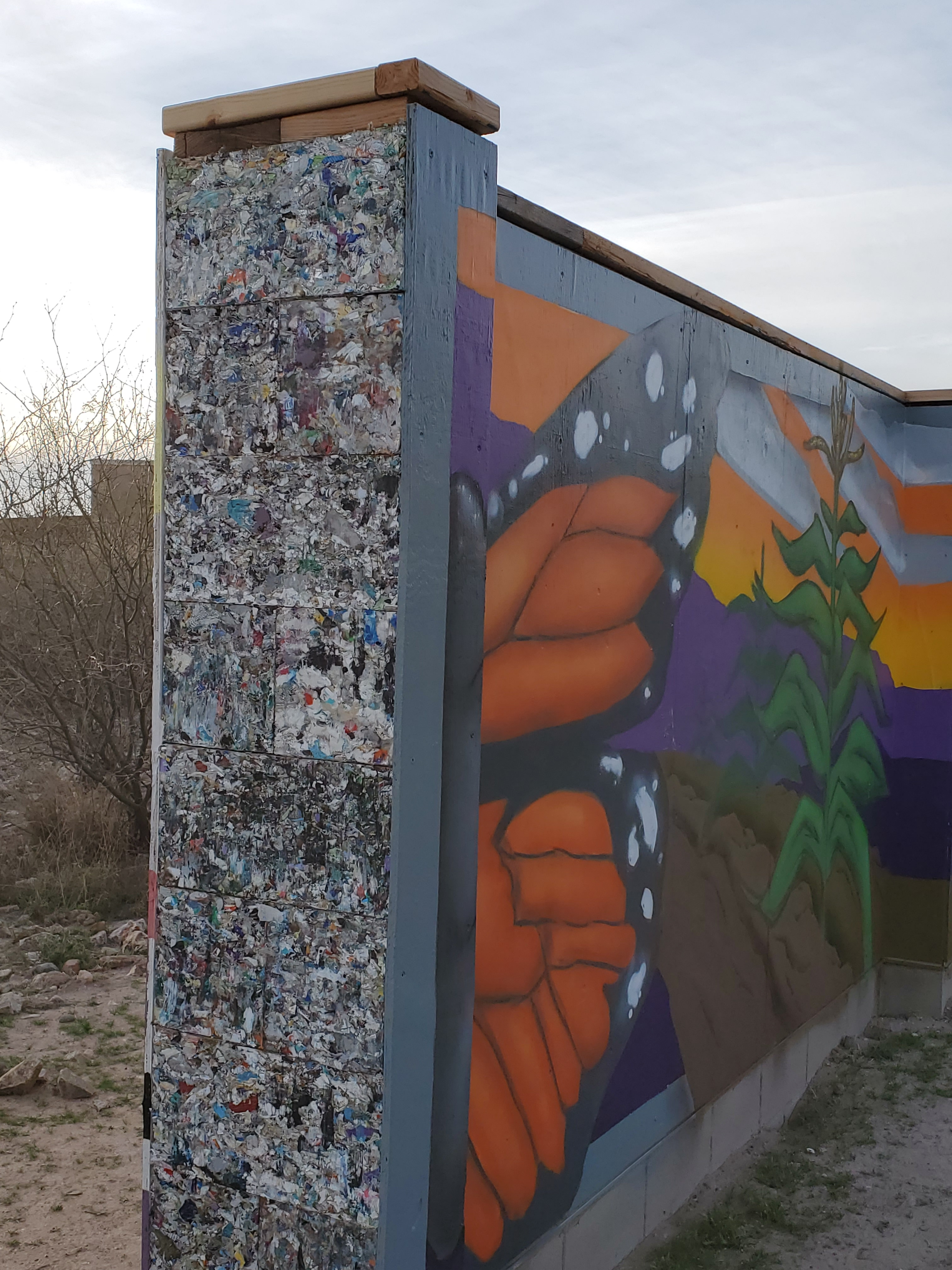
Mural on Mission Garden wall made of recycled plastic blocks

== Public engagement ==
=== Regular visits ===
On-site visitor parking near the main gate is free. Admission to Mission Garden is also free, but small donations such as $5/person are the norm. Open hours change with the seasons. For example, Mission Garden typically opens earlier in the summer than in the winter because Sonoran Desert temperatures can be extremely high. Visitors can explore on their own or ask for a docent to guide them through all or part of the grounds. Mission Garden offers weekly and monthly opportunities to learn about foods currently being harvested through tastings, recipes, and related material. Many visitors come to explore agricultural and culinary aspects of their own cultural backgrounds. Some come to learn about gardening in arid environments. Child visitors can follow the Bookworm Path. This series of 20 stations features books such as The Tiny Seed by Eric Carle and encourages activities such as finding a metate, a bee, or a roadrunner. (The roadrunners in Mission Garden are named Kevin.)

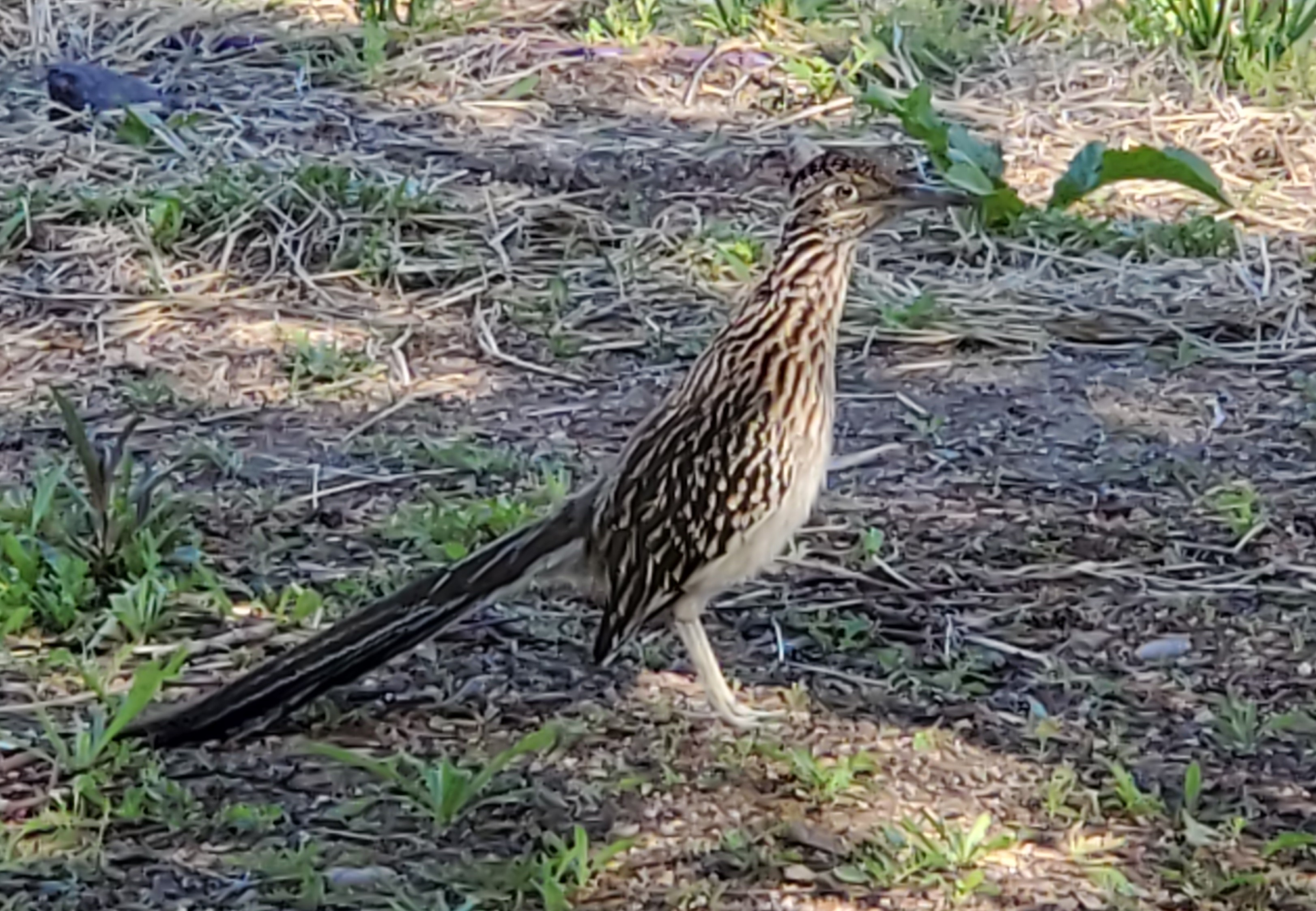
A roadrunner named Kevin

=== Special events ===
Mission Garden hosts a number of monthly events. These include guided bird walks (the webpage cited here links to a bird list with photographs), presentations on traditional O’odham agriculture, and hands-on archeology activities. Special workshops and other educational events occur irregularly but often. Examples with associated fees include workshops on propagation and grafting of fruit trees and on making herbal salves.

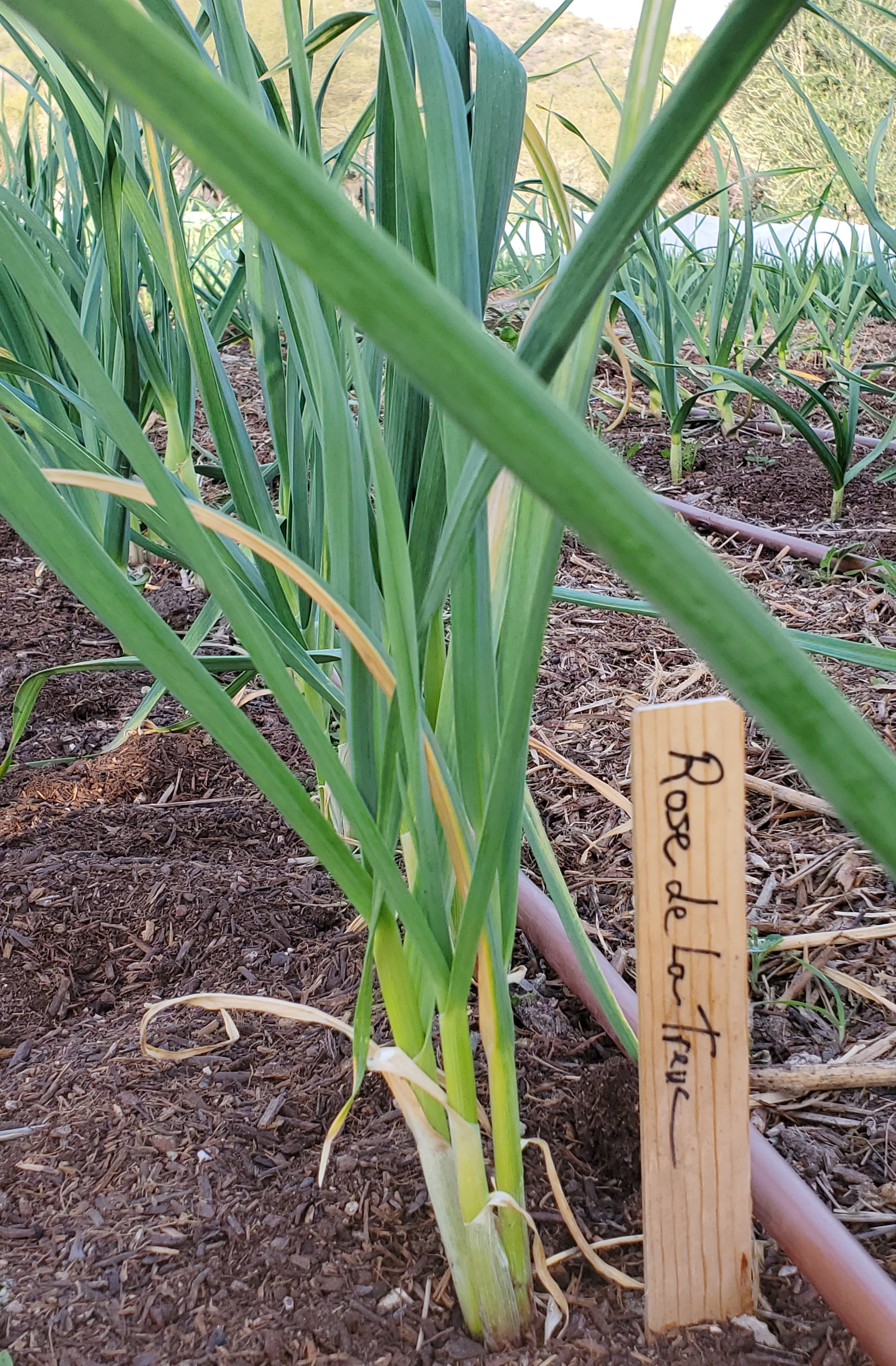
Garlic field at Mission Garden

Each year also includes events coordinated with the harvest of particular crops. Special events usually involve other entities. Mission Garden contributes to Tucson's Agave Heritage Festival, which celebrates the cultural and commercial importance of agave. Visitors to Mission Garden's contribution to this festival can taste roasted agave hearts and mezcal. Honoring the patron saint of laborers and farmers, Mission Garden's San Ysidro Festival starts with blessings from representatives of the San Xavier District of the Tohono O’odham Nation. A field of heritage wheat is harvested, threshed, winnowed, and milled with traditional methods. Visitors also enjoy foods using this wheat, such as craft baker Don Guerra's bread and pozole de trigo. Another example is Mission Garden's Membrillo Festival, which celebrates quince with empanadas de membrillo and cajeta de membrillo. Also notable is the Garlic Festival, which shares kinds of garlic that grow in the Sonoran Desert. During the Mesquite Milling event, people who have harvested mesquite beans can have them run through one of the hammer mills at the event. Good mesquite beans can be harvested from trees growing where they benefit from uncontaminated water, including hiking trails and backyards.

Mission Garden's website is kept up to date, and its calendar shows the regularly occurring and special events.

Also, fund raisers and one-off celebrations such as weddings can be scheduled at Mission Garden. Field trips for schools and other groups are also common; these can be arranged for particular emphases, depending on available personnel.

=== Community relations ===
As described above, much of what Mission Garden accomplishes depends on collaborations with other individuals and organizations. These collaborators have a variety of emphases. For example, Mission Garden's model acequia hosts endangered Gila topminnows through a collaboration with the U.S. Fish and Wildlife Service. Other collaborators focus on the history or culture of northern Mexico and southern Arizona. Volunteers from the Presidio San Agustín del Tucson Museum, for example, often contribute to festivals by demonstrating clothing and tools that were used by people who lived in the Tucson presidio built in 1775. Yet other collaborating organizations focus on the local foodscape. Volunteers from Iskashitaa Refugee Network, for example, help grow and distribute Mission Garden's food; they also demonstrate traditional agricultural methods during special events such as the San Ysidro Festival. US-based and international chefs also collaborate with Mission Garden on occasion. Visitors often ask what Mission Garden does with the food that it produces. Much of it is given to food pantries such as those run by the Community Food Bank of Southern Arizona and to refugee groups such as Iskashitaa. Some of the produce also goes to Mission Garden's volunteers.

== Management ==
=== Leadership ===
Mission Garden's executive director is Alyce Sadongei. Sadongei served previously in various roles at the Smithsonian Institution and the Arizona State Museum; she is a current member of the Historical Commission for Tucson and Pima County.

The Friends of Tucson's Birthplace board of directors also helps Mission Garden with fund-raising and management.

A number of donors and distinguished friends also influence Mission Garden's management. Exemplifying the latter are baker Don Guerra, a James Beard Award winner who is known for collaborating with farmers growing heritage grains; Gary Paul Nabhan, a scholar who is known for his leadership of local food and heirloom seed saving movements; and Linda Ronstadt, a musician who kept her home in Tucson for many years and remains connected to the community.

Mission Garden also hosts several interns every year, many with connections to the University of Arizona. Some work in the gardens for course credit or through programs such as Americorp or the Paul D. Coverdell Fellows Program. Coverdell Fellow Brad Kindler, for example, wrote his 2018 Masters thesis on sustainable and innovative ways that food might be grown in the future, as environments face challenges such as water scarcity and higher temperatures.

=== Volunteers ===
In 2023, over 300 people supported Mission Garden by volunteering over 11,000 hours in various roles. Docents are typically experts in particular plots, types of food, a specific culture, or a specific era of history. They do field trips in the area and regularly study materials on such subjects in order to orient visitors arriving at the gates to Mission Garden. They give tours to families, classes, and other groups on request; they help plan and carry out events at Mission Garden, as well as supporting its presence at other venues. Because Mission Garden uses organic techniques and grows plants in areas representing different cultures and times, many gardening tasks are labor-intensive. After some orientation and training, volunteers can choose schedules and tasks to their interests and abilities. Tasks that gardening enthusiasts typically do include preparing soil, planting seeds or seedlings, weeding and picking off bugs, irrigating, mulching, and harvesting and measuring the results. Volunteers can also help with Mission Garden's seed saving enterprise or work in the library. Mission Garden's gift shop is usually also covered by volunteers, and every special event has extra opportunities for volunteers such as welcoming visitors and preparing food and cleaning up afterwards.
