= Tucson Origins Heritage Park =

- Location within Arizona
- 32°12′54″N 110°59′05″W
- Type: Historic park
- Location: Tucson, Arizona, United States

Tucson Origins Heritage Park is an under construction historic park located in Tucson, Arizona, United States. The park is located between Sentinel Peak and the Santa Cruz River. The park is directly accessible from the Cushing & Convento Sun Link station.

== Park units ==
When fully completed, the park will consist of the following:

- Mission Garden - a "living agricultural museum" owned by Pima County
- S-cuk Son
- Mission Complex
- Festival Area - owned by the City of Tucson
- the Carrillo House - owned by Rio Nuevo
- two museum sites along Cushing Street

== History ==
The park was first conceptualized in 2003 as a part of a 1999 ballot initiative approved to preserve and reconstruct the site of Mission San Cosme y Damián de Tucsón.

In 2012, the Spanish Colonial Heritage Fruit Tree Orchard was planted. The garden was gradually expanded to encompass a variety of historical and contemporary agricultural techniques utilized by cultural groups around the world.

In 2015, UNESCO recognized Tucson as a part of its Creative Cities Network for its commitment to strengthening its unique gastronomy-based economy and sustainable urban development.

In early 2020, the onset of the COVID-19 pandemic in Arizona slowed construction progress.

== See also ==
- Arizona-Sonora Desert Museum
