= Iskashitaa Refugee Network =

Refugee organization in Tucson, Arizona

Iskashitaa Refugee Network (previously known as the Iskashitaa Refugee Harvesting Network) is a grass roots organization based in Tucson, Arizona, that partners with volunteers and local organizations to provide various supplemental services to refugees to complement those offered by resettlement agencies. The organization was founded by Dr. Barbara Eiswerth, who holds a Ph.D. in Arid Lands Resource Management, and is currently directed by Eiswerth. Iskashitaa has a number of programs designed to empower refugees and unite them with staff and volunteers from the community. A primary component of these programs is gleaning, or harvesting unwanted produce from property owners and commercial farmers. Iskashitaa's gleaning efforts have grown from harvesting a few thousand pounds of fruit each year to over 100,000 pounds annually of fruit, nuts, and vegetables: a cumulative one million servings of local produce.

== Meaning of Iskashitaa ==
Iskashitaa means "working cooperatively together" in the language of the Somali Bantu people, called Maay Maay. The spelling of Iskashitaa was chosen by Eiswerth, as there was no written representation of the Maay Maay language at the time of Iskashitaa's inception. In its early years, the name of the organization was spelled with an asterisk, as Iskash*taa.

== People ==
Iskashitaa originally worked with Somali Bantus, but has expanded to work with refugee populations from around the world. These refugees and asylum seekers arrive from Afghanistan, Bhutan, Burma, Burundi, the Central African Republic, Cuba, the Democratic Republic of the Congo, the Republic of the Congo, Egypt, Equatorial Guinea, Eritrea, Ethiopia, Iran, Iraq, Liberia, Russia, Rwanda, Ukraine, Somalia, South Sudan, Sudan, and Syria.

== History ==
Eiswerth worked as a researcher in Malawi villages, and wrote her dissertation there. Upon her return to Tucson, she noticed rotting fruit that had fallen from trees and began the harvesting work for which Iskashitaa is known. Her background in environmental science and land management combined with her experience in Africa inspired her to start the harvesting work for which Iskashitaa is known. "As an environmental scientist, the road to sustainability is using what we have right here," she says. "We can do the right thing, which is not let food go to waste." In 2002, Eiswerth launched a project through the Tucson Youth Work Enhancement program to educate local high school teens about food resources. Together, they mapped 162 homes with 296 fruit-producing trees. Unwanted fruit harvested from these trees was then distributed to local farmers' markets and soup kitchens. In 2003, Eiswerth recruited refugee students to participate in a project identifying locations of produce that was going to waste in Tucson, as she had with the high school students. The refugee youth harvested and redistributed this food. After organizing two more youth mapping programs, Eiswerth received a grant from the United Way of America to begin regularly harvesting with refugees.

Since then, Iskashitaa has gathered about 400,000 pounds of produce that has been redistributed to thousands of Tucson residents experiencing food insecurity. Over the years, the organization has offered English and swimming lessons for refugees, cooking classes for the members of the community, sewing and craft circles, and catalog sales of the goods Iskashitaa refugees make.

== Funding ==
Iskashitaa Refugee Network is an Arizona nonprofit.a federal 501(c)(3), Iskashitaa's funding comes from a combination of donations, grants, and earned income through sales.

== Objectives ==
Iskashitaa Refugee Network is a local nonprofit whose mission is to assist refugees on their journeys to fulfilled lives in Tucson, using food-based programming as an entry point to community. Iskashitaa's primary objective is to "empower refugees by creating opportunities to better integrate with the larger Tucson community while gaining skills that serve them in America." The organization's programs utilize connections, sharing, and English language practice to attain this objective. Iskashitaa has built a networking community among Tucson area refugee volunteers and agencies that cooperate to make this mission possible.

== Programs ==
Iskashitaa Harvesting

Iskashitaa harvesters consist of an inter-generational group of refugees from Africa, Asia, and the Middle East as well as local Tucsonan volunteers. This group harvests roughly 100,000 pounds of fruits and vegetables each year from backyards and local farms. This produce is then redistributed to refugee families from many countries, food shelves, and other Tucson organizations that assist food insecure families, either for free or for a nominal price. One of the organizations that collaborates with Iskashitaa is Mission Garden.{} Members of Iskashitaa help tend the plots there, demonstrate traditional farming methods, and share Mission Garden produce with others.

Iskashitaa Cooking and Food Preservation

Refugees teach other Iskashitaa volunteers and staff about their own cultural dishes, typically using food that has been harvested. These interactions intend to make refugees more comfortable in an American kitchen, and introduce Tucson locals to different cultures. Volunteers and program staff also teach refugees how to make preserved foods from their own families' traditions. Groups have prepared jams, jellies, preserves, Nepali spices, and juices, to name a few. Often, food products are sold at local stores to sustain the organization's work.

English as a Second Language

Iskashitaa offers ESL Classes to refugees, designed to work with every individual, regardless of education levels or diverse backgrounds, experiences, and languages. These classes focus on language acquisition and cultural exchange, and work to develop relationships between teachers and students, as well as assist in the acculturation process by introducing material based on life in the United States. Students often interact with Tucson locals through Iskashitaa's other programs to practice their new language skills. College students from the University of Arizona have also taught refugees, through the Honors Civic Engagement Team (HCET).

== Recognition ==
Iskashitaa has been published in a number of local and national publications, such as the Arizona Daily Wildcat, Eating Well, Zocalo Magazine, and Sow What, a Girl Scouts of the USA handbook. Both Iskashitaa and its director have received several awards and recognitions for their work. In 2007, Eiswerth won Gardener's Supply Company's Garden Crusader Award, which awards the recipient $12,000 in cash and prizes for making a difference in their community. In 2008, Eiswerth presented her harvesting plan at a Faith-Based and Community Initiatives Roundtable. The documentary, "Iskash*taa: An Invitation to Community," created by Eiswerth, won a U.S. Department of Health and Human Services "Portraits of Compassion" award. Besides these, Eiswerth was named a National Finalist in Community for Sustainable Food, and also received the Baha'i "Vision in Action Award", the Church Women United's Human Rights Award, The Jewish Federation of Southern Arizona's Meyer and Libby Marmis Humanitarian Award, and Interfaith Community Services' Silver Spoon Award. Iskashitaa's work has also been recognized by the White House by the Community Based Initiative through a winning video in "Portraits of Compassion". In addition, in 2011 Eiswerth, one of the six recognized, was awarded the Hon Kachina Volunteer Award in the State of Arizona for her efforts as a community volunteer.
