= Mission San Cosme y Damián de Tucsón =

17th-century Spanish mission in Tucson, Arizona

Misión de San Agustín del Tucson
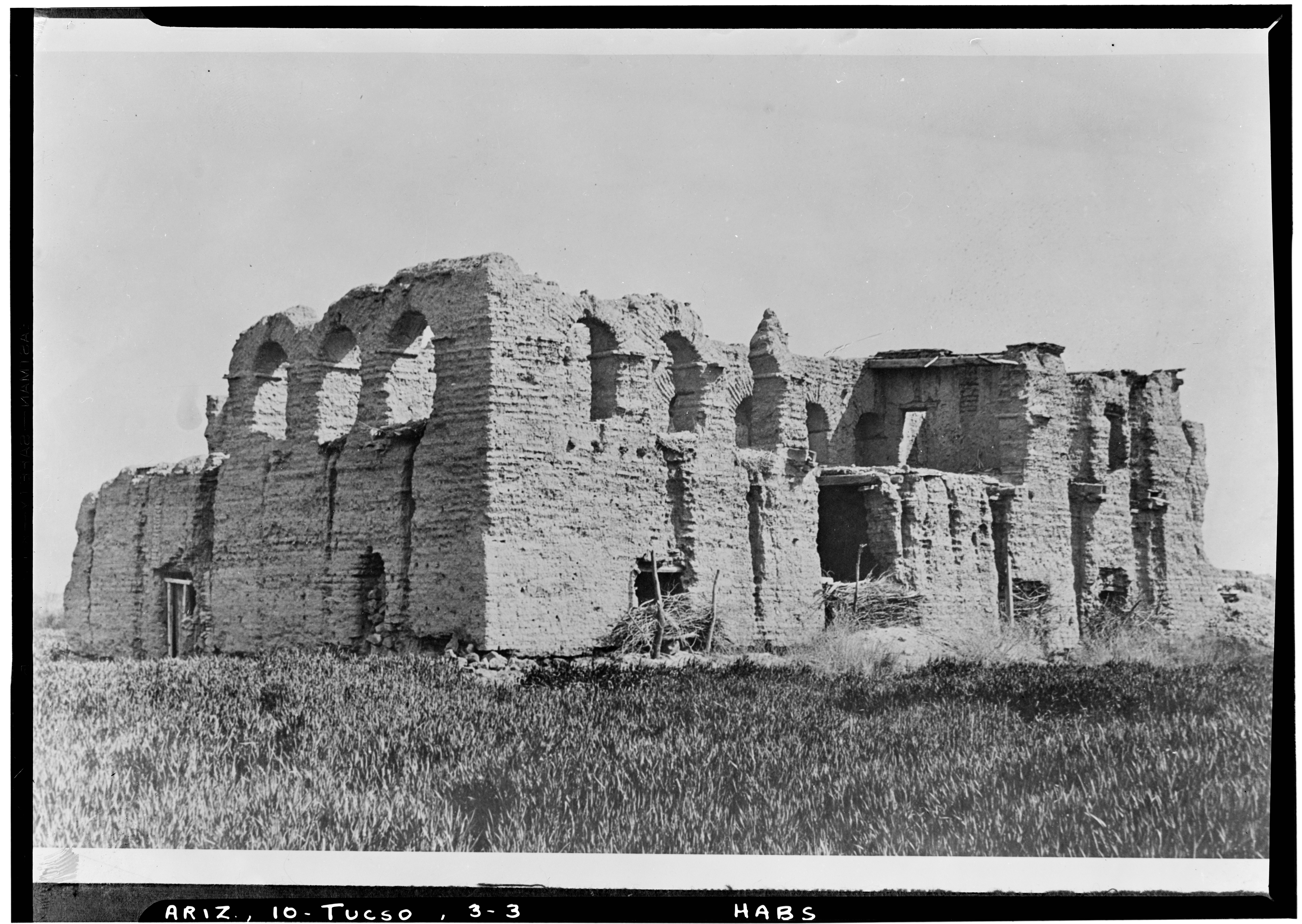
- Mission San Cosme y Damián de Tucsón as it appeared in 1881, heavily decayed

- Location in Arizona
- Location: Tucson, Arizona, United States
- Coordinates: 32°12′48″N 110°59′13″W
- Name as founded: Misión de San Agustín del Tucson
- Patron: Augustine of Hippo
- Founded: 1692
- Founded by: Eusebio Francisco Kino
- Founding Order: Jesuits
- Current use: Nonextant

Mission San Cosme y Damián de Tucsón (Spanish: Misión San Cosme y Damián de Tucsón), originally known as Mission San Agustín del Tucson (Spanish: Misión de San Agustín del Tucson), was a Spanish mission located in present-day Tucson, Pima County, Arizona. It was established in 1692 by Jesuit missionary Eusebio Francisco Kino as a visita, or "visiting chapel", of the nearby Mission San Xavier del Bac. Today, almost nothing remains of the original complex.

== Location ==
The mission was located along the western bank of the Santa Cruz River, at the base of Sentinel Peak or "A" Mountain. The Sobaipuri village of Chuk Shon, meaning "at the foot of the black mountain", was located nearby.

== History ==
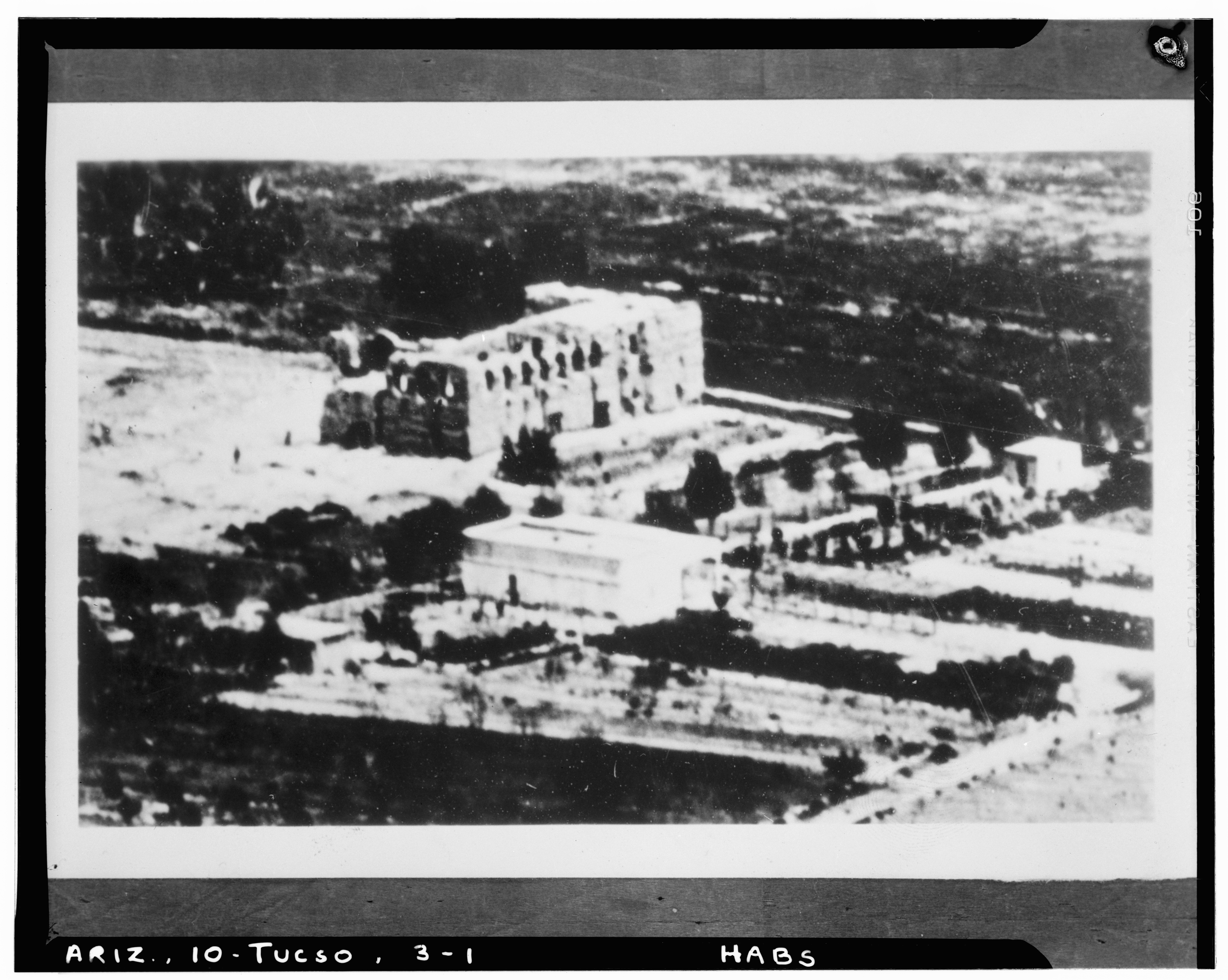
Mission San Cosme y Damián de Tucsón as seen from Sentinel Peak ('A' Mountain) in 1880.

The mission would be built, near the Sobaipuri village of Chuk Shon which Padre Eusebio Francisco Kino named San Cosmé del Tucson. Here Father Kino established a visita, or "visiting chapel", of Mission San Xavier del Bac in 1692. In 1768 the visita was expanded, fortified and renamed Mission San Agustín del Tucson by the Franciscans who had just replaced the Jesuits in the Missions. This was soon followed by the establishment of a Presidio San Augustin del Tucson in 1776 on the east side of the Santa Cruz River. The pueblo of Tucson grew up near the Presido along the river.

The Mission was finally abandoned in 1828. Its lands were sold off and the neglected buildings were eventually destroyed. In 1852, John Russell Bartlett visited the mission, writing:

The houses of Tucson are all of adobe, and the majority are in a state of ruin. No attention seems to be given to repair; but as soon as a dwelling becomes uninhabitable, it is deserted, the miserable tenants creeping into some other hovel where they may eke out their existence.

Between 1950 and 2010, the site served as a landfill for the city of Tucson.

== Present day ==
Since 2010, site has been under the care of the non-profit organization Friends of Tucson’s Birthplace. The former landfill and mission site is being repurposed as a historical and nature park called Tucson Origins Heritage Park.

== See also ==
- List of Jesuit sites
- Spanish missions in Arizona
