= Desert hackberry =

Desert hackberry may refer to:

- Celtis ehrenbergiana, a shrub or small tree that grows in dry locations, also called the desert hackberry or spiny hackberry
- Asterocampa leilia, a species of butterfly whose larvae feed on the hackberry
