= Earworm =

Music or saying that sticks in the mind

An earworm or brainworm, also described as sticky music or stuck song syndrome, is a catchy or memorable piece of music or saying that continuously occupies a person's mind even after it is no longer being played or spoken about. Involuntary Musical Imagery (INMI) is most common after earworms, but INMI as a label is not solely restricted to earworms; musical hallucinations also fall into this category, although they are not the same thing. Earworms are considered to be a common type of involuntary cognition. Some of the phrases often used to describe earworms include "musical imagery repetition" and "involuntary musical imagery".

The word earworm is a calque from the German Ohrwurm. The earliest known English usage is in Desmond Bagley's 1978 novel Flyaway, where the author points out the German origin of his word.

Researchers who have studied and written about the phenomenon include Theodor Reik, Sean Bennett, Oliver Sacks, Daniel Levitin, James Kellaris, Philip Beaman, Vicky Williamson, Diana Deutsch, and, in a more theoretical perspective, Peter Szendy, along with many more. The phenomenon is distinct from palinacousis, a rare medical condition caused by damage to the temporal lobe of the brain that results in auditory illusions.

== Incidence and causes ==
Researcher Vicky Williamson at Goldsmiths, University of London, found in an uncontrolled study that earworms correlated with music exposure, but could also be triggered by experiences that trigger the memory of a song (involuntary memory) such as seeing a word that reminds one of the song, hearing a few notes from the song, or feeling an emotion one associates with the song. The list of songs collected in the study showed no particular pattern, other than popularity.

According to research by James Kellaris, 98% of individuals experience earworms. Women and men experience the phenomenon equally often, but earworms tend to last longer for women and irritate them more. Kellaris produced statistics suggesting that songs with lyrics may account for 73.7% of earworms, whereas instrumental music may cause only 7.7%.

In 2010, published data in the British Journal of Psychology directly addressed the subject, and its results support earlier claims that earworms are usually 15 to 30 seconds in length and are more common in those with an interest in music. Earworms can occur with either 'positive' or 'negative' music. Positive music in this case is music that sounds happy or calm. Negative music is the opposite, where the music sounds angry or sad.

Earworms are not related only to music with lyrics; in a research experiment conducted by Ella Moeck and her colleagues in an attempt to find out if the positive or negative feeling of a piece of music affected earworms caused by that piece, they used only instrumental music. Her experiment determined that all participants experienced a similar quantity of earworms, regardless of the emotional valence, although the quality of the earworm did vary. The earworms born from the negatively valenced music brought about more distress and occurred less frequently than those produced by positively valenced music.

According to the Harvard Medical School earworms can sometimes occur with obsessive-compulsive disorder, psychotic syndromes, migraine headaches, unusual forms of epilepsy, or a condition known as palinacousis — when a person continues to hear a sound long after it has disappeared. Persistent earworms (lasting more than 24 hours) may be caused by many different illnesses, such as stroke or cancer metastasizing to the brain.

== Antidotes ==
Scientists at Western Washington University found that engaging working memory in moderately difficult tasks such as anagrams, puzzles or reading was an effective way of stopping earworms and of reducing their recurrence. Another publication points out that melodic music has a tendency to demonstrate repeating rhythm which may lead to endless repetition, unless a climax can be achieved to break the cycle.

Research reported in 2015 by the School of Psychology and Clinical Language Sciences at the University of Reading demonstrated that chewing gum could help by similarly blocking the sub-vocal rehearsal component of auditory short-term or "working" memory associated with generating and manipulating auditory and musical images. It has also been suggested to ask oneself why one is experiencing this particular song. Another suggested remedy is to try to find a "cure song" to stop the repeating music.

There are also so-called "cure songs" or "cure tunes" to get the earworm out of one's head. "God Save the King" is cited as a very popular and helpful choice of cure song. "Happy Birthday" was also a popular choice in cure songs.

Listening to the tune in a different tempo or lower pitch, or a remixed version if it exists, can be an antidote. Listening to the tune from start to finish can also help. Since earworms are usually only a fragment of music, playing the tune all the way through can help break the loop.

== Notable cases ==
Jean Harris, who murdered Herman Tarnower, was obsessed with the song "Put the Blame on Mame" by Allan Roberts and Doris Fisher, which she first heard in the film Gilda (1946). She would recall this regularly for over 33 years and could even hold a conversation while playing it in her mind.

== In popular culture ==
Mark Twain's 1876 story "A Literary Nightmare" (also known as "Punch, Brothers, Punch") is about a jingle that one can get rid of only by transferring it to another person.

In 1943, Henry Kuttner published the short story "Nothing but Gingerbread Left" about a song engineered to damage the Nazi war effort, culminating in Adolf Hitler being unable to continue a speech.

In Alfred Bester's 1953 novel The Demolished Man, the protagonist uses a jingle specifically crafted to be a catchy, irritating nuisance as a tool to block mind readers from reading his mind.

In Arthur C. Clarke's 1957 science fiction short story "The Ultimate Melody", a scientist, Gilbert Lister, develops the ultimate melody – one that so compels the brain that its listener becomes completely and forever enraptured by it. As the storyteller, Harry Purvis, explains, Lister theorized that a great melody "made its impression on the mind because it fitted in with the fundamental electrical rhythms going on in the brain." Lister attempts to abstract from the hit tunes of the day to a melody that fits in so well with the electrical rhythms that it dominates them completely. He succeeds and is found in a catatonic state from which he never awakens.

In Fritz Leiber's Hugo Award-nominated short story "Rump-Titty-Titty-Tum-TAH-Tee" (1959), the title describes a rhythmic drumbeat so powerful that it rapidly spreads to all areas of human culture, until a counter-rhythm is developed that acts as an antidote.

In Joe Simpson's 1988 book Touching the Void, he talks about not being able to get the tune "Brown Girl in the Ring" by Boney M out of his head. The book tells of his survival, against the odds, after a mountaineering accident in the remote Siula Grande region of South America. Alone, badly injured, and in a semi-delirious state, he is confused as to whether he is imagining the music or really hearing it.

In the Dexter's Laboratory episode titled "Head Band", a contagious group of viruses force their host to sing what they are saying to the same "boy band" tune. The only way to be cured of the Boy Band Virus is for the viruses to break up and start their own solo careers.

In the SpongeBob SquarePants episode titled "Earworm", SpongeBob gets the "Musical Doodle" song stuck in his head, giving him an earworm, which ultimately turns out to be an actual worm, which is removed by his friends singing or playing other songs.

In The Lego Movie 2: The Second Part, one popular scene features most of the film's characters being subjected to a "Catchy Song" and all (except Lucy) dance to it, while simultaneously the denizens of Harmony Town sing it to Emmet and Rex. Lucy/Wildstyle avoids being "brainwashed" by the song by breaking one of the speakers and using some of its pieces to build earmuffs for herself before escaping via air ducts, while Emmet and Rex escape similarly.

E. B. White's 1933 satirical short story "The Supremacy of Uruguay" (reprinted in Timeless Stories for Today and Tomorrow) relates a fictional episode in the history of Uruguay where a powerful earworm is discovered in a popular American song. The Uruguayan military builds a squadron of pilotless aircraft armed with phonographs playing a highly amplified recording of the earworm, and conquers the entire world by reducing the citizens of all nations to mindless insanity. "[T]he peoples were hopelessly mad, ravaged by an ineradicable noise ... No one could hear anything except the noise in his own head."

In 2014, musician Emperor X wrote a deliberately catchy song titled 10,000-Year Earworm to Discourage Settlement Near Nuclear Waste Repositories (Don't Change Color, Kitty) in reference to the "ray cat" idea in nuclear semiotics, attempting to embed a warning message in folklore that would still be remembered in 10,000 years.

In 2023–2024, an "earworm eraser" clip created by Atlassian was popularized on social media.

In the film Earworm from 2025, the main character Ulph Degerfors is plagued by a severe case of earworm as Rednex's Cotton Eye Joe takes over his mind. Gradually, he spirals toward madness, with everything he experiences and hears becoming tainted by the song.

== Key characteristics ==
According to research done in 2016 by Kelly Jakubowski and colleagues, published by the American Psychological Association, there are certain characteristics that make songs more likely to become earworms. Earworm songs usually have a fast-paced tempo and an easy-to-remember melody. However, earworms also tend to have unusual intervals or repetitions that make them stand out from other songs. Earworms also tend to be played on the radio more than other songs and are usually featured at the top of the charts. The chorus of a song is one of the most reported causes of earworms.

The most frequently named earworms during this study were the following:

1. "Bad Romance" by Lady Gaga
2. "Can't Get You Out of My Head" by Kylie Minogue
3. "Don't Stop Believin'" by Journey
4. "Somebody That I Used to Know" by Gotye featuring Kimbra
5. "Moves like Jagger" by Maroon 5 featuring Christina Aguilera
6. "California Gurls" by Katy Perry featuring Snoop Dogg
7. "Bohemian Rhapsody" by Queen
8. "Alejandro" by Lady Gaga
9. "Poker Face" by Lady Gaga

== Susceptible traits ==
Kazumasa Negishi and Takahiro Sekiguchi did a study to see if there are specific traits that make a person more or less susceptible to earworms or involuntary musical imagery. The participants in the study were assessed on obsessive-compulsive tendencies, the Big Five personality traits, and musical expertise. Negishi and Sekiguchi found that some of the obsessive-compulsive traits, such as intrusive thoughts, played a role in experiencing earworms while compulsive washing did not. In terms of the Big Five personality traits, neuroticism significantly predicted occurrences of earworms. Musical expertise created an effect of sophistication when it came to earworm occurrences.

== Tools used in data gathering ==
One tool used to gather data on involuntary musical imagery (INMI)—and, more specifically, earworms—is called the Involuntary Musical Imagery Scale; it was created with the research compiled from George Floridou, Victoria Williamson, and Danial Müllensiefen. It uses four factors to measure different experiences surrounding earworms and INMI in general. Those four factors include 'Negative Valence', 'Movement', 'Personal Reflections', and 'Help'. Negative Valence is the category that measures the subjective response to the INMI experience. Movement, a relatively new aspect of the INMI experience, refers to accompanying embodied responses such as singing, humming, and dancing. Personal Reflections is the occurrence of a personal quality, like unrelated thoughts, associated with the INMI; they are not directly related to the valence of the INMI itself. Help is the category which determines the beneficial and constructive aspects to the INMI experiences, which could potentially reflect similarities in the characteristics of unfocused music listing and task-unrelated thought.

== See also ==
- Idée fixe (psychology)
- Phonological loop
- Subliminal stimuli
- Tetris effect
