= List of 99% Invisible episodes =

Radio and podcast show episodes

This is a list of 99% Invisible podcast episodes, hosted by Roman Mars. From its inception in 2010 until April 2021, 99% Invisible was produced and distributed by Radiotopia. In April 2021, the company that produces the show (99% Invisible Inc.) was acquired by SiriusXM, with 99% Invisible moving to the Stitcher Radio network.

== List of episodes ==
=== 2010 ===
No.	Title	Original release date	Running time
1	"99% Noise"	September 3, 2010	4:21
Acoustic design, city soundscapes, and how to make listening in shared spaces pleasant.
2	"99% 180"	September 9, 2010	4:30
History of the perception of the Transamerica Pyramid within the architecture community.
3	"99% Reality (only)"	September 17, 2010	4:30
Description of the app RJDJ and the implications of environment-aware, adaptable sound.
4	"99% Details"	September 24, 2010	4:33
5	"99% Forgotten"	October 1, 2010	4:30
6	"99% Symbolic"	October 8, 2010	4:29
7	"99% Alien"	October 14, 2010	4:30
8	"99% Free Parking"	October 29, 2010	4:51
9x	"99% Doomed"	November 1, 2010	11:31
9	"99% Private"	November 5, 2010	4:29
10	"99% Sound and Feel"	November 19, 2010	4:51
11	"99% Undesigned"	November 24, 2010	4:31
12	"99% Guilt Free"	December 3, 2010	4:29
13	"Maps"	December 17, 2010	4:30
13x	"Game Over (Snap Judgment)"	December 30, 2010	11:06

=== 2011 ===
No.	Title	Original release date	Running time
14	"Periodic Table"	February 4, 2011	6:00
15	"Sounds of the Artificial World"	February 11, 2011	4:51
16	"A Designed Language"	February 18, 2011	5:54
17	"Concrete Furniture"	February 25, 2011	6:33
18	"Check Cashing Stores"	March 4, 2011	5:05
19	"Liberation Squares plus NY Dick"	March 11, 2011	10:46
19x	"RJDJ Reactive Music"	March 21, 2011	9:29
20	"Nikko Concrete Commando"	March 25, 2011	6:53
21	"BLDGBLOG: On Sound"	April 1, 2011	5:22
22	"Free Speech Monument"	April 15, 2011	7:32
23	"You Are Listening To + Radio Net"	April 22, 2011	19:46
24	"The Capitol Columns"	May 6, 2011	6:29
History and Status of the Original Columns of the US Capitol
25	"Unsung Icons of Soviet Design"	May 13, 2011	8:00
1950s era Soviet Consumer Goods Compared to Western Goods
26	"Chicago's Jailhouse Skyscraper"	May 20, 2011	7:21
27	"Bridge to the Sky"	June 3, 2011	4:44
28	"Movie Title Sequences"	June 9, 2011	9:10
29	"Cul de Sac"	June 17, 2011	11:46
30	"The Blue Yarn"	July 1, 2011	10:19
Efficiency of a Toyota Plant Translated to American Hospitals
31	"Feltron Annual Report"	July 14, 2011	9:55
32	"Design for Airports"	July 28, 2011	8:07
33	"A Cheer for Samuel Plimsoll"	August 4, 2011	6:56
34	"The Speed of Light for Building Pyramids"	August 19, 2011	9:59
35	"Elegy for WTC"	September 1, 2011	6:21
36	"Super Bon Bonn"	September 16, 2011	9:55
37	"The Steering Wheel"	September 29, 2011	7:19
38	"Sound of Sport"	October 13, 2011	5:29
39	"Darth Vader Family Courthouse"	October 28, 2011	7:33
39x	"The Biography of 100,000 Square Feet"	November 18, 2011	31:17
40	"Billy Possum"	November 23, 2011	12:05
41	"The Human-Human Interface"	December 3, 2011	5:10
42	"Recognizably Anonymous"	December 9, 2011	10:36
43	"The Accidental Music of Imperfect Escalators"	December 19, 2011	7:20

=== 2012 ===
No.	Title	Original release date	Running time
44	"The Pruitt-Igoe Myth"	January 6, 2012	11:27
45	"Immersive Ideal"	January 18, 2012	12:05
46	"Vulcanite Dentures"	January 27, 2012	9:26
47	"US Postal Service Stamps"	February 10, 2012	12:26
48	"The Bathtubs or the Boiler Room"	February 27, 2012	11:07
49	"Queue Theory and Design"	March 9, 2012	9:54
50	"DeafSpace"	March 23, 2012	11:42
51	"The Arsenal of Exclusion"	April 4, 2012	10:47
52	"Galloping Gertie"	April 18, 2012	12:27
53	"The Xanadu Effect"	May 1, 2012	11:21
54	"The Colour of Money"	May 16, 2012	16:41
55	"The Best Beer in the World"	May 31, 2012	13:21
56	"Frozen Music"	June 14, 2012	10:24
57	"What Gave You That Idea?"	June 28, 2012	14:29
58	"Purple Reign"	July 13, 2012	14:59
59	"Some Other Sign that People Do Not Totally Regret Life"	July 25, 2012	16:37
60	"Names vs The Nothing"	August 6, 2012	14:13
60a	"Two Storeys"	August 22, 2012	8:36
60b	"BackStory: Heyward Shepherd Memorial"	September 10, 2012	12:41
61	"A Series of Tubes"	September 20, 2012	17:25
62	"Q2"	October 2, 2012	15:18
63	"The Political Stage"	October 12, 2012	15:16
64	"Derelict Dome"	October 25, 2012	14:35
65	"Razzle Dazzle"	November 5, 2012	12:44
66	"Kowloon Walled City"	November 19, 2012	15:41
67	"Broken Window"	November 29, 2012	11:43
68	"Built for Speed"	December 12, 2012	12:35
69	"The Brief and Tumultuous Life of the New UC Logo"	December 31, 2012	24:55

=== 2013 ===
No.	Title	Original release date	Running time
70	"The Great Red Car Conspiracy"	January 11, 2013	13:47
71	"In and Out of LOVE"	January 23, 2013	16:39
72	"New Old Town"	February 5, 2013	20:35
73	"The Zanzibar and Other Building Poems"	February 18, 2013	11:59
74	"Hand Painted Signs"	March 8, 2013	12:49
75	"Secret Staircases"	March 21, 2013	11:58
The exploration of hidden public outdoor staircases in California as mapped by Charles Fleming.
76	"The Modern Moloch"	April 4, 2013	24:21
The invention of the car and the resulting rise of automobile fatalities, and how the concept of jaywalking came to be.
77	"Game Changer"	April 15, 2013	12:32
The design of the sport of basketball, from the amusing history of the basketball hoop and net to the addition of a nearly-invisible element which redefined and changed the game: the shot clock.
78	"No Armed Bandit"	April 30, 2013	19:28
The history and design of slot machines, the concept and mental state of uninterrupted play (flow), and why and how people gamble.
79	"Symphony of Sirens, Revisited"	May 8, 2013	24:28
Arseny Avraamov's "Symphony of Factory Sirens," a musical performance by the city of Moscow itself, featuring factory sirens, foghorns, soldiers' footsteps, guns, whistles, and proletarian shouts.
80	"An Architect's Code"	May 28, 2013	18:11
The ethics of designing and constructing buildings intended for solitary confinement such as Pelican Bay State Prison.
81	"Rebar and the Alvord Lake Bridge"	June 7, 2013	11:57
The invention of rebar, or steel-reinforced concrete, and its use in the Alvord Lake Bridge in Golden Gate Park.
82	"The Man of Tomorrow"	June 20, 2013	12:56
The design of Superman, and how the character has managed to stay relevant, and popular, for over 75 years.
83	"Heyoon"	July 2, 2013	28:24
A group of teenagers' secret hangout at what they called "Heyoon," a pavilion on a piece of private property in Ann Arbor, Michigan.
84a	"Ladislav Sutnar"	July 15, 2013	2:26
One of Ladislav Sutnar's most important contributions to the world: the design of parenthetical area codes.
84b	"Trading Places with Planet Money"	July 16, 2013	28:08
A joint episode with NPR's Planet Money on the economics of the end of the 1983 film Trading Places.
85	"Noble Effort"	July 29, 2013	17:43
Maurice Noble's work as a layout artist with Warner Brothers and his lasting impact on the art of animation.
86	"Reversal of Fortune"	August 8, 2013	20:22
Reversing the flow of the Chicago River.
87	"I Heart NY, TM"	August 21, 2013	19:44
Milton Glaser's ubiquitous I Love New York design, and its popularity, effects, and influences.
88	"The Broadcast Clock"	September 3, 2013	16:50
The use broadcast clocks—diagrams depicting specific programming element times—in radio, specifically on NPR.
89	"Bubble Houses"	September 17, 2013	25:14
Wallace Neff's airform "bubble" houses made of shotcrete.
90a	"Strowger Switch"	October 2, 2013	3:45
The design of the modern telephone exchange and history of the telephone switchboard.
90b	"Purple Reign Redux"	October 2, 2013	20:25
An update to Episode 58, reporting on the destruction of the Purple Hotel.
91	"Wild Ones Live"	October 14, 2013	32:52
A live performance of a segment from Jon Mooalem's book Wild Ones: A Sometimes Dismaying, Weirdly Reassuring Story About Looking at People Looking at Animals in America, featuring music by the band Black Prairie.
91x	"Kickstarter Announcement - Always Read the Plaque"	October 26, 2013	3:25
Announcement of the Kickstarter project for Season 4 of 99% Invisible and a short story about the importance of reading commemorative plaques.
92	"All The Buildings"	October 28, 2013	21:21
James Gulliver Hancock's project of drawing every building in New York City.
93	"Revolving Doors"	November 6, 2013	18:14
The history and design of revolving doors, including their energy-saving potential and reasons behind their use or lack thereof.
94	"Unbuilt"	November 12, 2013	25:39
Maps and designs of unbuilt structures and communities, from Oakland to Manhattan to the Marin Headlands.
95	"Future Screens Are Mostly Blue"	November 20, 2013	24:48
96	"DIY Space Suits"	December 2, 2013	15:44
The story of Cameron Smith's efforts to build his own space suit.
97	"Numbers Stations"	December 20, 2013	23:36
Shortwave radio stations that only broadcast numbers.

=== 2014 ===
No.	Title	Original release date	Running time
98	"Six Stories"	January 2, 2014	21:11
The history of the safety elevator and Elisha Otis.
99	"The View From The 79th Floor"	January 14, 2014	16:39
The 1945 B-25 Empire State Building crash and Betty Lou Oliver's 79-floor fall—and survival.
100	"Higher and Higher"	February 3, 2014	18:53
The origins of the Chrysler Building and the Manhattan Company Building, and the stories of their architects.
101	"Cover Story"	February 11, 2014	20:15
The long, surprising history of magazine cover design, featuring various iconic covers and design directors.
102	"Icon For Access"	February 18, 2014	16:41
A history and design of the International Symbol of Access (or Wheelchair Symbol) and a grassroots movement promoting its redesign to better serve and represent the disabled community.
103	"UTBAPH"	February 25, 2014	17:11
The architecture and history behind Pizza Hut's ever-recognizable building design and a blog dedicated to cataloguing restaurants that "Used To Be A Pizza Hut."
104	"Tunnel 57"	March 4, 2014	21:54
The story and design of a tunnel running underneath the Berlin Wall constructed by a university student and his friends, the lives it saved, and its creator.
105	"One Man Is An Island"	March 11, 2014	20:50
A story of a peculiar landmass named Busta Rhymes Island and naming conventions set by the U.S. Board on Geographic Names.
106	"The Fancy Shape"	March 17, 2014	17:12
107	"Call Now!"	March 25, 2014	21:04
108	"Barcodes"	April 1, 2014	19:13
109	"Title TK"	April 8, 2014	17:52
110	"Structural Integrity"	April 15, 2014	24:34
111	"Masters of the Uni-verse"	April 22, 2014	18:01
112	"Young Ruin"	April 29, 2014	20:06
113	"Monumental Dilemma"	May 6, 2014	25:06
114	"Ten Thousand Years"	May 13, 2014	30:54
Attempts at the Waste Isolation Pilot Plant and the proposed Yucca Mountain nuclear waste repository to leave long-term nuclear waste warning messages that can persist for 10,000 years, including an eccentric proposal for cats that change color when exposed to radiation.
115	"Cow Tunnels"	May 20, 2014	23:22
116	"Breaking the Bank"	May 27, 2014	20:45
117	"Clean Trains"	June 3, 2014	20:59
118	"Song Exploder"	June 10, 2014	20:46
119	"Feet of Engineering"	June 17, 2014	15:46
120	"Skyjacking"	June 23, 2014	16:54
121	"Cold War Kids"	July 1, 2014	23:31
122	"Good Egress"	July 8, 2014	19:26
123	"Snowflake"	July 15, 2014	18:08
124	"Longbox"	July 22, 2014	18:37
125	"Duplitecture"	July 29, 2014	12:28
126	"Walk This Way"	August 4, 2014	17:10
127	"The Sound of Sports"	August 14, 2014	61:48
128	"Hacking Ikea"	August 19, 2014	20:19
129	"Thomassons"	August 26, 2014	16:18
130	"Holdout"	September 2, 2014	18:54
131	"Genesis Object"	September 10, 2014	13:42
132	"Castle On The Park"	September 16, 2014	18:45
133	"Port of Dallas"	September 23, 2014	20:21
134	"The Straight Line is a Godless Line"	September 30, 2014	17:51
135	"For Amusement Only"	October 7, 2014	15:01
136	"Lights Out"	October 14, 2014	19:09
137	"Good Bread"	October 22, 2014	18:52
138	"O-U-I-J-A"	October 28, 2014	22:06
This Halloween episode covers the history and psychology of the ouija board game.
139	"Edge Of Your Seat"	November 4, 2014	18:16
140	"Vexillonaire"	November 11, 2014	14:18
141	"Three Records From Sundown"	November 18, 2014	31:54
142	"And the winner Is"	November 25, 2014	15:39
143	"Inflatable Men"	December 2, 2014	16:48
Giant inflatable tube men known as Airdancers often promote sales events. This episode interviews the creator of these waving and flailing tube men.
144	"There Is a Light That Never Goes Out"	December 9, 2014	15:58
The story of the Centennial Light in Livermore, California, that has been burning almost non-stop for 113 years.
145	"Octothorpe"	December 16, 2014	16:29
146	"Mooallempalooza"	December 30, 2014	45:58

=== 2015 ===
No.	Title	Original release date	Running time
147	"Penn Station Sucks"	January 6, 2015	18:22
148	"The Sizzle"	January 13, 2015	16:00
149	"Of Mice And Men"	January 20, 2015	19:15
150	"Under The Moonlight"	January 27, 2015	17:35
151	"La Mascotte"	February 3, 2015	18:44
152	"Guerrilla Public Service"	February 10, 2015	15:51
153	"Game Over"	February 17, 2015	11:56
About the end of The Sims Online.
154	"PDX Carpet"	February 24, 2015	16:47
155	"Palm Reading"	March 3, 2015	16:42
156	"Coin Check"	March 10, 2015	17:40
157	"Devil's Rope"	March 17, 2015	23:00
158	"Sandhogs"	March 31, 2015	26:23
159	"The Calendar"	April 8, 2015	19:44
160	"Perfect Security"	April 14, 2015	18:03
161	"Show of Force"	April 21, 2015	22:25
162	"Mystery House"	April 28, 2015	19:36
163	"The Gruen Effect"	May 5, 2015	18:24
164	"The Post-Billiards Age"	May 12, 2015	15:30
165	"The Nutshell Studies"	May 19, 2015	26:11
166	"Viva La Arquitectura!"	May 26, 2015	21:32
167	"Voices in the Wire"	June 2, 2015	40:44
168	"All In Your Head"	June 10, 2015	32:48
169	"Freud's Couch"	June 16, 2015	15:47
170	"Children of the Magenta (Automation Paradox, pt. 1)"	June 23, 2015	32:24
171	"Johnnycab (Automation Paradox, pt.2)"	June 30, 2015	24:02
172	"On Location"	July 14, 2015	16:50
173	"Awareness"	July 21, 2015	19:32
174	"From the Sea, Freedom"	July 28, 2015	20:26
175	"The Sunshine Hotel"	August 4, 2015	30:52
An NPR documentary about the Sunshine Hotel, a flophouse in New York City.
176	"Hard to Love a Brute"	August 11, 2015	20:21
177	"Lawn Order"	August 18, 2015	18:33
178	"The Great Restoration"	August 25, 2015	31:30
179	"Bathysphere"	September 1, 2015	23:58
180	"Reefer Madness"	September 8, 2015	18:00
181	"Milk Carton Kids"	September 15, 2015	19:42
182	"A Sweet Surprise Awaits You"	September 22, 2015	18:10
183	"Dead Letter Office"	September 29, 2015	19:11
184	"Rajneeshpuram"	October 1, 2015	31:14
185	"Atmospherians"	October 19, 2015	24:02
186	"War and Pizza"	October 27, 2015	20:28
187	"Butterfly Effects"	November 1, 2015	20:06
188	"Fountain Drinks"	November 10, 2015	35:05
189	"The Landlord's Game"	November 17, 2015	18:15
190	"Fixing the Hobo Suit"	November 24, 2015	21:13
191	"Worst Smell in the World"	December 2, 2015	14:54
192	"Pagodas and Dragon Gates"	December 8, 2015	24:26
193	"Tube Benders"	December 13, 2015	16:31
194	"Bone Music"	December 22, 2015	14:21

=== 2016 ===
No.	Title	Original release date	Running time
195	"Best Enjoyed By"	January 12, 2016	17:19
196	"The Fresno Drop"	January 19, 2016	15:46
197	"Fish Cannon"	January 26, 2016	18:15
198	"The Ice King"	February 2, 2016	18:23
199	"The Yin and Yang of Basketball"	February 9, 2016	21:52
200	"Miss Manhattan"	February 15, 2016	19:01
201	"The Green Book"	February 23, 2016	22:51
202	"Mojave Phone Book"	March 1, 2016	20:48
203	"The Giftschrank"	March 8, 2016	21:43
204	"The SoHo Effect"	March 15, 2016	19:39
205	"Flying Food"	March 22, 2016	18:18
206	"The White Elephant of Tel Aviv"	March 29, 2016	21:44
207	"Soul City"	April 5, 2016	34:04
208	"Vox Ex Machina"	April 12, 2016	24:46
209	"Supertall 101"	April 19, 2016	19:26
210	"Unseen City: Wonders of the Urban Wilderness"	April 26, 2016	28:57
211	"The Grand Dame of Broad Street"	May 3, 2016	22:12
212	"TurfWars of East New York"	May 10, 2016	29:51
213	"Separation Anxiety"	May 17, 2016	18:30
214	"Loud and Clear"	May 24, 2016	21:44
215	"H-Day"	June 7, 2016	18:59
216	"The Blazer Experiment"	June 14, 2016	24:17
217	"Home on Lagrange"	June 21, 2016	29:04
218	"Remembering Stonewall"	June 28, 2016	29:08
219	"Unpleasant Design & Hostile Urban Architecture"	July 5, 2016	16:34
220	"The Mind of an Architect"	July 12, 2016	24:04
221	"America's Last Top Model"	July 19, 2016	22:19
222	"Combat Hearing Loss"	July 26, 2016	19:26
223	"The Magic Bureaucrat and His Riverside Miracle"	August 2, 2016	34:23
Interviews the bureaucrat and welfare worker Larry Townsend, who organized a welfare program in Riverside County, California in the early 1990s.
224	"A Sea Worth its Salt"	August 9, 2016	19:42
The environmental history of Southern California's Salton Sea, a high salinity lake which was created by accident and is slowly evaporating.
225	"Photo Credit"	August 16, 2016	20:32
A brief history of Lucia Moholy, a lesser known Bauhaus photographer, and the impact of her work.
226	"On Average"	August 23, 2016	20:02
Much of the world is designed for the "average" human, a person who doesn't exist. Todd Rose re-evaluates what that means and how we can better create for the non-average.
227	"Public Works"	September 6, 2016	16:09
American infrastructure is in trouble. By discussing the United States' road system, civil engineering professor Henry Petroski explains what is needed to get it back on track.
228	"Making Up Ground"	September 16, 2016	20:39
Developing societies sometimes have to rely on land reclamation to make the land more suitable for human activities.
229	"The Trend Forecast"	September 20, 2016	17:41
The clothing industry is constantly, and fashion experts such as WGSN attempt to forecast upcoming fashion trends.
230	"Project Cybersyn"	October 4, 2016	23:53
On Project Cybersyn, a cybernetics project developed in Chile under the presidency of Salvador Allende aimed at monitoring and controlling the Chilean economy.
231	"Half a House"	October 11, 2016	22:32
On incremental building created by Alejandro Aravena and its application by his architecture firm Elemental S.A.
232	"McMansion Hell: The Devil is in the Details"	October 18, 2016	16:36
The design of the McMansion is discussed with Kate Wagner, the creator of the blog McMansion Hell.
233	"Space Trash, Space Treasure"	October 25, 2016	22:59
Space debris has been accumulating since humans have been sending satellites into space. This episodes explores possible means for cleaning up this debris and future opportunities for space tourism.
234	"The Shift: Redesigning Baseball's Defense"	November 1, 2016	20:48
Baseball statistics changed the way players and coaches approach the game. This has, to some extent, led to the development of the infield shift.
235	"Ten Letters for the President"	November 8, 2016	18:46
During the presidency of Barack Obama, the White House Office of Presidential Correspondence would sort through all communications sent to the President Obama and choose ten messages for him to read.
236	"Reverb: The Evolution of Architectural Acoustics"	November 15, 2016	23:44
The history of architectural acoustics and reverberation.
237	"Dollar Store Town: Inside the World's Biggest Wholesale Market"	November 22, 2016	17:43
238	"NBC Chimes: Behind the Scenes with the First Trademarked Sound"	November 29, 2016	15:09
How the NBC chimes became one of the most iconic sounds in radio history.
239	"Guano Mania"	December 6, 2016	20:51
The history of the Guano Islands Act.
240	"Plat of Zion"	December 12, 2016	19:46
Joseph Smith, the founder of the Latter Day Saint movement, produced a city plan for the utopian city Zion. This plan, which uses the grid system, was later adapted by Brigham Young to design Salt Lake City, Utah.
241	"Mini-Stories: Volume 1"	December 20, 2016	28:54
Members of the 99% Invisible production team share short stories that they have gathered while researching for the show. These stories include the "squaring" of the circular grid of Circleville, Ohio, the "Dutch reach" method of opening a car door near a bike lane, the Estádio Milton Corrêa stadium on the Equator, and the design of the LIGO experiment.

=== 2017 ===
No.	Title	Original release date	Running time
242	"Mini-Stories: Volume 2"	January 10, 2017	31:36
The second installment in which the 99% Invisible staff share short stories of interest that weren't suitable for a standalone episode. These stories include the reversed American flag, Beatrix Campbell colorfully describing the history of The Byker Wall, entries of fake "paper towns" in maps as copyright traps, knox boxes, and a design comparison of the Snellen and LogMAR eyesight charts.
243	"Tom Swift and His Electric Rifle"	January 17, 2017	22:08
The history of police reform after the shooting of Eulia Love and the development of the Taser.
244	"The Revolutionary Post"	January 24, 2017	19:57
The author Winifred Gallagher has argued that the United States Postal Service created America. This episode examines this claim, from its origins with Benjamin Franklin, and its history with the Pony Express, to more modern developments.
245	"The Eponymist"	January 31, 2017	29:18
246	"Usonia 1"	February 7, 2017	26:30
This episode examines the history of Frank Lloyd Wright's ambitious housing project Usonia. The project was meant to be inexpensive and customizable, fitting into its environment.
247	"Usonia the Beautiful"	February 14, 2017	21:32
The second part of 99% Invisible's episode series on Frank Lloyd Wright's housing project Usonia. This episode focuses on the project's legacy, including Usonian houses still used in modern times, and its influence on modern architecture.
248	"Atom in the Garden of Eden"	February 21, 2017	20:47
In 1953, U.S. President Dwight D. Eisenhower delivered his famous speech "Atoms for Peace" and set up a program for the peaceful use of atomic energy. One of the projects of this program was atomic gardening, which involved using radiation to produce mutated crops.
249	"Church (Sanctuary, Part 1)"	February 28, 2017	30:29
The modern sanctuary movement started after the Nicaraguan Revolution of 1979. Migrants fleeing the revolution sought refuge in the United States, but many were turned down under the 1980 Refugee Act. John Fife, a Presbyterian minister in Tucson, Arizona decided that it was their duty to shelter these immigrants, starting the sanctuary movement.
250	"State (Sanctuary, Part 2)"	March 7, 2017	30:29
After a group of churches in the 1980s decided that they would defy the law and shelter illegal immigrants fleeing civil wars in El Salvador and Guatemala, the Immigration and Naturalization Service started examining this new sanctuary movement by sending out undercover agents. Some participants in the movement, including Rev. John Fife were found guilty of breaking immigration laws. Some churches sued the government in a case which was settled in 1990 giving immigrants work permits.
251	"Negative Space: Logo Design with Michael Bierut"	March 14, 2017	30:44
Roman Mars interviews graphic designer Michael Bierut. They discuss logo design in the 2016 U.S. presidential election, how people react to changes in logos, and logo criticism in general.
252	"The Falling of the Lenins"	March 21, 2017	25:00
After the fall of the Soviet Union, Ukrainian citizens started tearing down monuments of Vladimir Lenin. This episode describes the debate behind these removals and their historical significance.
253	"Manzanar"	March 28, 2017	27:04
During World War II, thousands of Japanese Americans were interned in camps such as Manzanar. In the 1970s, activists such as Warren Furutani and Sue Kunitomi Embrey formed the Manzanar Committee to lobby for the site to be recognized as a historic landmark.
254	"Containers: The Ships, the Tugs and the Port"	April 4, 2017	33:39
An excerpt from Alexis Madrigal's audio documentary "Containers" about the history of container ships.
255	"The Architect of Hollywood"	April 10, 2017	23:23
The life and works of the Los Angeles-based African American architect Paul Williams.
256	"Sounds Natural"	April 18, 2017	25:51
Footage shot for documentary films often does not come with adequate sound, so the film crew has sound recordists and Foley artists add sounds to "fix" this. Includes interviews with Chris Palmer, Richard Hinton, and Chris Watson.
257	"Reversing the Grid"	April 2, 2017	28:57
Electricity meters were designed to measure the amount of electric energy consumed by a household. However, when electricity leaves a house, the dial turns backward. While this presented little to no problems at first, the rise of solar power has brought this feature back into the spotlight.
258	"The Modern Necropolis"	May 9, 2017	20:11
The history of Colma, California, a necropolis where the dead far outnumber the living.
259	"This Is Chance: Anchorwoman of the Great Alaska Earthquake"	May 16, 2017	28:40
When the 1964 Alaska earthquake shook Anchorage, Alaska and killed 115 people, the survivors and the outside world relied on the reporting of Genie Chance to understand the situation.
260	"New Jersey"	May 23, 2017	20:30
After Brazil lost the 1950 FIFA World Cup, the team held a contest to redesign their jerseys. The winner of this contest, Aldyr Schlee, describes his inspiration for and views of the jersey design.
261	"Squatters of the Lower East Side"	May 30, 2017	28:07
As a result of gentrification in Manhattan in the 1960s and '70s, some residents of Lower East Side resorted to squatting in abandoned buildings. In 2002, these squatters finally bought their homes with the help of the Urban Homesteading Assistance Board.
262	"In the Same Ballpark"	June 13, 2017	27:09
After the Baltimore Orioles opened their new stadium in 1992, many other baseball teams followed suit, creating smaller stadiums that fit into the existing geography of their cities.
263	"You Should Do a Story"	June 20, 2017	28:11
This episode features many short stories. Chevron operates some gas stations with a Standard awning, to keep the trademark. Desire paths are shortcuts bicyclists and pedestrians take to navigate more smoothly. In the late 1800s, the Los Angeles Area had to switch the frequency of its electricity from 50 Hz to 60 Hz, to match the rest of the country. Many designs are used only locally, such as European tilt-and-turn windows, Finnish dish draining closets, Japanese Kotatsu tables, and the Australian Hills Hoist. A town in Saskatchewan, unable to afford its own streets signs, may have taken Calgary's old signs, and just renamed their roads.
264	"Mexico 68"	June 27, 2017	23:46
The 1968 Summer Olympics in Mexico City used a graphic design campaign across the entire city, created by Lance Wyman and Peter Murdoch. On October 2, 1968, the peaceful Mexico 68 student movement was massacred by the Mexican government. Both sides used a version of Wyman's design to promote their ideologies—the status quo, or change. The iconography was also used in the Mexico City Metro map.
265	"The Pool and the Stream"	July 4, 2017	32:21
The Donnell Garden's pool's shape, like a kidney bean, became famous, inspired by Alvar Aalto's functionalist design in the Villa Mairea. These pools sprawled across Southern California, and a drought in the 1970s let Aalto's shape become the basis for skateparks around the world.
266	"Repackaging the Pill"	July 11, 2017	19:57
The history of the birth control pill and its packaging.
267	"The Trials of Dan and Dave"	July 18, 2017	54:37
The first episode of ESPN's recently debuted 30 for 30 Podcasts. In 1992, Reebok launched the Dan & Dave advertising campaign, marketed as an attempted to decide whether Dan O'Brien or Dave Johnson was "the world's greatest athlete." The campaign was altered after O'Brien failed to qualify for the 1992 Summer Olympics.
268	"El Gordo"	July 25, 2017	26:28
In late 2011, the Spanish village Sodeto won the largest prize to date in the Spanish Christmas Lottery drawing, a sum of about 750 million euros. Every resident had purchased at least one share of the winning ticket except one, a Greek filmmaker who has chronicled the villager's experience with their newfound wealth.
269	"Ways of Hearing"	August 1, 2017	39:36
The first episode of Radiotopia's new podcast Showcase, which explains how the music world transformed when recording methods transitioned from analog to digital.
270	"The Stethoscope"	August 6, 2017	21:41
The impact of the stethoscope on medical history in the late modern and contemporary periods.
271	"The Great Dismal Swamp"	August 15, 2017	26:09
The history of the Great Dismal Swamp which borders Virginia and North Carolina, and the maroons who inhabited it in the 18th and early 19th centuries after escaping slavery.
272	"Person in Lotus Position"	August 17, 2017	30:44
This episode explains how the film producer Mark Bramhill came up with the "Person in Lotus Position" (🧘) emoji and submitted it to the Unicode Consortium for approval.
273	"Notes on an Imagined Plaque"	August 29, 2017	13:48
A story originally told by Nate DiMeo in The Memory Palace, this episode imagines what the plaque for the Nathan Bedford Forrest Monument could have looked like as a tribute Nathan Bedford Forrest, a Confederate Army general and Ku Klux Klan member.
274	"The Age of the Algorithm"	September 5, 2017	25:18
275	"Coal Hogs Work Safe"	September 11, 2017	25:23
276	"The Finnish Experiment"	September 19, 2017	32:41
277	"Pointe City Tower"	September 26, 2017	33:14
278	"The Athletic Brassiere"	October 3, 2017	27:39
279	"The Containment Plan"	October 10, 2017	28:56
280	"Half Measures"	October 17, 2017	29:09
281	"La Sagrada Familia"	October 24, 2017	35:30
282	"Oyster-tecture"	October 31, 2017	35:24
283	"Dollhouses of St. Louis"	November 7, 2017	31:03
284	"Hero Props: Graphic Design in Film & Television"	November 13, 2017	26:35
285	"Money Makers"	November 21, 2017	19:53
286	"A 700-Foot Mountain of Whipped Cream"	November 28, 2017	53:48
287	"The Nut Behind the Wheel"	December 5, 2017	31:35
288	"Guerrilla Public Service Redux"	December 12, 2017	20:39
289	"Mini-Stories: Volume 3"	December 19, 2017	37:47

=== 2018 ===
No.	Title	Original release date	Running time
290	"Mini-Stories: Volume 4"	January 9, 2018	39:48
291	"Thermal Delight"	January 16, 2018	28:40
292	"Speech Bubbles: Understanding Comics with Scott McCloud"	January 23, 2018	31:36
293	"Managed Retreat"	January 30, 2018	31:42
294	"Border Wall"	February 6, 2018	28:48
295	"Making a Mark: Visual Identify with Tom Geismar"	February 13, 2018	27:11
296	"Bijlmer (City of the Future, Part 1)"	February 20, 2018	23:29
297	"Blood, Sweat & Tears (City of the Future, Part 2)"	February 27, 2018	33:01
298	"Fordlandia"	March 6, 2018	30:11
299	"Gerrymandering"	March 20, 2018	44:51
300	"Airships and the Future that Never Was"	March 27, 2018	19:13
301	"Making It Rain"	April 3, 2018	28:22
302	"Lessons from Las Vegas"	April 9, 2018	33:19
303	"The Hair Chart"	April 17, 2018	23:10
304	"Gander International Airport"	April 24, 2018	25:22
305	"The Laff Box"	May 1, 2018	39:58
306	"Breaking Bad News"	May 8, 2018	39:04
307	"Immobile Homes"	May 15, 2018	28:50
308	"Curb Cuts"	May 22, 2018	45:14
309	"The Vault"	May 29, 2018	27:05
310	"77 Steps"	June 5, 2018	23:57
311	"The Barney Design"	June 11, 2018	22:36
312	"Post-Narco Urbanism"	June 19, 2018	37:24
313	"Right to Roam"	June 26, 2018	28:21
Special	"Roman Mars on ZigZag"	July 5, 2018	31:30
314	"Interrobang"	July 10, 2018	32:05
315	"Everything is Alive"	July 17, 2018	32:03
316	"The Shipping Forecast"	July 24, 2018	27:53
317	"Built to Burn"	July 31, 2018	31:54
318	"Fire and Rain"	August 7, 2018	30:25
319	"It's Chinatown"	August 14, 2018	35:53
320	"Bundyville"	August 21, 2018	42:43
321	"Double Standards"	August 28, 2018	25:41
322	"The First Straw"	September 4, 2018	24:49
323	"The House that Came in the Mall"	September 11, 2018	32:11
324	"Billboard Boys: The Greatest Radio Contest of All Time"	September 18, 2018	28:49
Articles of Interest #1	"Kids' Clothes"	September 25, 2018	23:52
Articles of Interest #2	"Plaid"	September 28, 2018	18:55
Articles of Interest #3	"Pockets"	October 2, 2018	21:13
Articles of Interest #4	"Hawaiian Shirts"	October 5, 2018	23:18
Articles of Interest #5	"Blue Jeans"	October 9, 2018	26:10
Articles of Interest #6	"Punk Style"	October 12, 2018	30:48
325	"The Worst Way to Start a City"	October 16, 2018	31:07
326	"Welcome to Jurassic Art"	October 23, 2018	28:42
327	"A Year in the Dark"	October 30, 2018	32:24
328	"Devolutionary Design"	November 6, 2018	32:50
329	"Orphan Drugs"	November 13, 2018	27:39
330	"Raccoon Resistance"	November 27, 2018	25:54
331	"Oñate's Foot"	December 4, 2018	43:11
332	"The Accidental Room"	December 11, 2018	34:37
Bonus–Episode	"Avery talks Articles of Interest with Roman"	December 14, 2018	11:03
333	"Mini Stories: Volume 5"	December 18, 2018	43:45
334	"Christmas with The Allusionist"	December 24, 2018	36:50

=== 2019 ===
No.	Title	Original release date	Running time
335	"Gathering the Magic"	January 1, 2019	30:03
336	"Mini Stories: Volume 6"	January 8, 2019	48:40
337	"Atomic Tattoos"	January 15, 2019	34:37
338	"Crude Habitat"	January 22, 2019	35:26
339	"The Tunnel"	January 29, 2019	46:48
340	"The Secret Lives of Color"	February 5, 2019	44:58
341	"National Sword"	February 12, 2019	41:13
342	"Beneath the Ballpark"	February 19, 2019	30:45
343	"Usonia"	February 26, 2019	39:54
344	"The Known Unknown"	March 5, 2019	45:14
345	"Classic Cartoon Sound Effects!"	March 12, 2019	27:14
346	"Palaces for the People"	March 19, 2019	44:07
347	"The Many Deaths of a Painting"	March 26, 2019	40:47
348	"Three Things That Made the Modern Economy"	April 2, 2019	28:08
This episode features three episodes from 50 Things That Made the Modern Economy, a podcast that explores the histories of a number of inventions and their far-reaching consequences. It explains how the s-bend pipe revolutionized indoor plumbing, how the search for a 'death ray' led to the invention of radar, and the impact of bricks.
349	"Froebel's Gifts"	April 9, 2019	28:21
350	"The Roman Mars Mazda Virus"	April 16, 2019	58:17
351	"Play Mountain"	April 23, 2019	42:50
352	"Uptown Squirrel"	April 30, 2019	36:33
353	"From Bombay with Love"	May 7, 2019	38:50
354	"Weeding is Fundamental"	May 14, 2019	43:29
355	"Depave Paradise"	May 28, 2019	41:47
356	"The Automat"	June 4, 2019	40:45
357	"The Barney Design Redux"	June 11, 2019	31:48
358	"The Anthropocene Reviewed"	June 18, 2019	01:10:26
359	June 25, 2019	33:20	
360	"The Universal Page"	July 2, 2019	44:29
361	"Built on Sand"	July 9, 2019	36:41
362	"Goodness Gracious Great Balls of Twine"	July 16, 2019	41:28
363	"Invisible Women"	July 23, 2019	27:07
364	"He's Still Neutral"	July 30, 2019	32:55
365	"On Beeing"	August 6, 2019	24:52
366	"Model City"	August 13, 2019	01:01:30
367	"Peace Lines"	August 20, 2019	41:09
368	"All Rings Considered"	August 27, 2019	36:51
369	"Wait Wait... Tell Me!"	September 3, 2019	31:53
370	"The Pool and the Stream Redux"	September 10, 2019	40:45
371	"Dead Cars"	September 17, 2019	36:18
372	"The Help-Yourself City"	September 30, 2019	31:41
373	"The Kirkbride Plan"	October 9, 2019	42:38
374	"Unsure Footing"	October 15, 2019	30:13
375	"Audio Guide to the Imperfections of a Perfect Masterpiece"	October 22, 2019	31:24
This episode was a collaboration between 99% Invisible and the Guggenheim Museum.
376	"The Great Bitter Lake Association"	October 29, 2019	36:36
377	"How To Pick A Pepper"	November 5, 2019	36:54
378	"Ubiquitous Icons: Peace, Power, and Happiness"	November 12, 2019	35:57
379	"Cautionary Tales"	November 19, 2019	32:27
380	"Mannequin Pixie Dream Girl"	November 26, 2019	45:32
381	"The Infantorium"	December 3, 2019	39:01
382	"The ELIZA Effect"	December 10, 2019	49:04
383	"Mini-Stories: Volume 7"	December 18, 2019	46:20

=== 2020 ===
No.	Title	Original release date	Running time
384	"Mini-Stories: Volume 8"	January 7, 2020	50:37
385	"Shade"	January 14, 2020	30:48
386	"Their Dark Materials"	January 21, 2020	38:44
387	"The Worst Video Game Ever"	January 28, 2020	26:37
388	"Missed the Bus"	February 4, 2020	35:41
389	"Whomst Among Us Has Let The Dogs Out"	February 11, 2020	38:35
390	"Fraktur"	February 18, 2020	37:26
391	"Over The Road"	February 25, 2020	44:34
392	"The Weather Machine"	March 3, 2020	29:48
393	"Map Quests: Political, Physical and Digital"	March 10, 2020	41:59
394	"Roman Mars Describes Things As They Are"	March 17, 2020	20:01
395	"This is Chance! Redux"	March 24, 2020	47:19
396	"This Day in Esoteric Political History"	March 31, 2020	49:04
397	"Wipe Out"	April 7, 2020	33:01
398	"Unsheltered in Place"	April 14, 2020	45:51
399	"Masking for a Friend"	April 21, 2020	40:37
400	"The Smell of Concrete After Rain"	April 28, 2020	30:47
401	"The Natural Experiment"	May 5, 2020	01:09:54
Articles of Interest #7	"A Fantasy of Fashion"	May 12, 2020	40:30
Articles of Interest #8	"Knockoffs"	May 15, 2020	32:37
Articles of Interest #9	"Perfume"	May 19, 2020	29:48
Articles of Interest #10	"Suits"	May 26, 2020	32:25
Articles of Interest #11	"Diamonds"	May 29, 2020	31:20
Articles of Interest #12	"Wedding Dresses"	June 9, 2020	30:23
402	"Instant Gramification"	June 16, 2020	33:47
403	"Return of the Yokai"	June 23, 2020	34:04
404	"Return of Oñate's Foot"	June 30, 2020	55:12
405	"Freedom House Ambulance Service"	July 7, 2020	44:11
406	"A Side of Franchise"	July 14, 2020	38:07
407	"The Dolphin that Roared"	July 21, 2020	40:40
408	"Valleyof the Fallen"	July 28, 2020	35:00
409	"California Love Scared Straight"	August 4, 2020	40:33
410	"Policing the Open Road"	August 11, 2020	40:37
411	"Podcast Episode"	September 1, 2020	37:26
412	"Where Do We Go From Here?"	September 8, 2020	38:58
413	"Highways 101"	September 15, 2020	35:07
414	"The Address Book"	September 22, 2020	29:06
415	"Goodnight Nobody"	September 29, 2020	46:50
416	"Exploring The 99% Invisible City"	October 6, 2020	43:44
417	"For the Love of Peat"	October 13, 2020	42:36
-	"The Next Billion Users"	October 19, 2020	21:08
418	"Sign Stealing"	October 20, 2020	30:50
419	"Take a Walk"	October 27, 2020	35:55
420	"The Lost Cities of Geo"	November 3, 2020	45:15
421	"You've Got Enron Mail!"	November 9, 2020	34:31
422	"In The Unlikely Event"	November 17, 2020	33:02
423	"Sean Exploder"	November 20, 2020	33:38
424	"The Great Indoors"	November 24, 2020	29:56
-	"According to Need: Prologue"	December 1, 2020	18:04
According–Need	"Chapter 1: Tulicia"	December 1, 2020	35:38
According–Need	"Chapter 2: The Hotline"	December 4, 2020	36:56
According–Need	"Chapter 3: Housing First"	December 8, 2020	34:25
According–Need	"Chapter 4: The List"	December 11, 2020	33:08
According–Need	"Chapter 5: Housing Finally"	December 15, 2020	50:39
-	"Roman Mars on Bullseye"	December 18, 2020	39:35
425	"Mini-Stories: Volume 9"	December 22, 2020	43:13

=== 2021 ===
No.	Title	Original release date	Running time
426	"Mini-Stories: Volume 10"	January 12, 2021	42:58
427	"Mini-Stories: Volume 11"	January 19, 2021	52:06
428	"Beneath the Skyway"	January 26, 2021	45:52
429	"Stuccoed in Time"	February 2, 2021	46:25
430	"The Doom Boom"	February 8, 2021	35:39
431	"12 Heads from the Garden of Perfect Brightness"	February 16, 2021	38:42
432	"The Batman and the Bridge Builder"	February 23, 2021	35:38
433	"Florence Nightingale: Data Viz Pioneer"	March 2, 2021	39:54
434	"Artistic License"	March 8, 2021	36:44
435	"The Megaplex!"	March 15, 2021	36:23
436	"Oops, Our Bad"	March 23, 2021	33:29
437	"Science vs Snakes"	March 30, 2021	39:38
438	"The Real Book"	April 6, 2021	44:31
439	"Welcome to Jurassic Art Redux"	April 13, 2021	38:33
440	"La Brega in Levittown"	April 20, 2021	54:34
308	"Curb Cuts (Rerun)"	April 27, 2021	51:01
441	"Abandoned Ships"	May 4, 2021	30:54
442	"Tanz Tanz Revolution"	May 11, 2021	46:41
443	"Matters of Time"	May 17, 2021	56:14
444	"Pipe Dreams"	May 25, 2021	39:30
445	"The Clinch"	June 1, 2021	40:45
446	"Flag Days: Good Luck, True South"	June 8, 2021	46:51
447	"Flag Days: The Red, the Black & the Green"	June 15, 2021	37:20
448	"Katie Mingle's Right to Roam"	June 22, 2021	37:07
449	"Mine!"	June 29, 2021	32:55
450	"Stuff the British Stole"	July 13, 2021	48:54
451	"Hanko"	July 20, 2021	41:41
452	"The Lows of High Tech"	July 27, 2021	42:56
453	"The Book of Tasty and Healthy Food"	August 3, 2021	45:04
454	"War, Famine, Pestilence, and Design"	August 10, 2021	34:14
455	"A Field Guide to Water"	August 17, 2021	37:34
456	"Full Spectrum"	August 31, 2021	34:49
457	"Model Organism"	September 7, 2021	34:30
458	"Real Fake Bridges"	September 14, 2021	23:19
459	"Yankee Pyramids"	September 21, 2021	67:03
460	"Corpse, Corps, Horse and Worse"	September 28, 2021	33:05
323	"The House that Came in the Mail"	October 5, 2021	34:48
461	"Changing Stripes"	October 12, 2021	34:05
462	"I Can't Believe It's Pink Margarine"	October 19, 2021	29:07
463	"Fifty-Four Forty or Fight"	October 26, 2021	46:12
464	"Finding Julia Morgan"	November 2, 2021	44:46
465	"Shirley Cards"	November 8, 2021	34:54
466	"The Weight"	November 16, 2021	48:16
467	"Cute Little Monstrosities of Nature"	November 23, 2021	29:06
468	"Alphabetical Order"	November 29, 2021	34:36
469	"The Epic of Collier Heights"	December 7, 2021	46:00
470	"The Three Santas of Slovenia"	December 14, 2021	40:36
471	"Mini-Stories: Volume 12"	December 21, 2021	49:55

=== 2022 ===
No.	Title	Original release date	Running time
472	"Mini-Stories: Volume 13"	January 12, 2022	50:27
473	"Mini-Stories: Volume 14"	January 19, 2022	35:36
474	"The Punisher Skull"	January 25, 2022	39:39
475	"Rock Paper Scissors Bus"	February 2, 2022	31:00
476	"Reaction Offices and the Future of Work"	February 9, 2022	42:36
477	"Call of Duty: Free"	February 16, 2022	49:54
478	"Art Imitates Art"	February 22, 2022	40:58
479	"According to Need wins duPont-Columbia Award"	March 1, 2022	59:59
480	"Broken Heart Park"	March 8, 2022	47:09
481	"The Future of the Final Mile"	March 11, 2022	43:18
482	"Natalie de Blois: To Tell the Truth"	March 15, 2022	49:51
483	"Grid Locked"	March 22, 2022	49:37
484	"Dear Hank and John and Roman"	March 30, 2022	58:49
485	"Murder Most Fowl"	April 5, 2022	27:37
486	"Rumble Strip"	April 13, 2022	47:05
487	"Atlas Obscura"	April 20, 2022	45:36
488	"It's a Small Aisle After All"	April 26, 2022	36:49
489	"Pandemic Tracking and the Future of Data"	May 4, 2022	58:17
490	"Train Set"	May 10, 2022	32:43
491	"The Missing Middle"	May 18, 2022	37:24
492	"Inheriting Froebel's Gifts"	May 24, 2022	32:19
493	"Divining Provenance"	June 1, 2022	32:45
494	"Flag Days: Unfolding a Moment"	June 7, 2022	31:14
495	"Meet Us by the Fountain"	June 14, 2022	35:47
496	"The Rights of Rice and Future of Nature"	June 21, 2022	44:31
497	"Hometown Village"	June 28, 2022	43:28
498	"The Octagon House"	July 5, 2022	43:04
499	"Say Aloe to My Little Frond"	July 12, 2022	39:37
500	"99% Vernacular: Volume 1"	July 19, 2022	33:40
501	"99% Vernacular: Volume 2"	July 26, 2022	30:23
502	"99% Vernacular: Volume 3"	August 2, 2022	34:52
503	"Re:peat"	August 9, 2022	40:11
504	"Bleep!"	August 23, 2022	31:54
505	"First Errand"	August 30, 2022	28:58
506	"Monumental Diplomacy"	September 6, 2022	36:25
507	"Search and Ye Might Find"	September 13, 2022	36:12
508	"President Clinton Interviews Roman Mars"	September 20, 2022	49:12
509	"Tale of the Jackalope"	September 27, 2022	34:14
510	"Wickedest Sound"	October 4, 2022	42:01
511	"Vuvuzela"	October 11, 2022	32:12
512	"Walk of Fame"	October 18, 2022	47:20
513	"The Safety Bicycle"	October 25, 2022	33:17
514	"Train Set: Track Two"	November 8, 2022	32:22
515	"Super Citizens"	November 22, 2022	26:53
516	"Cougar Town"	November 29, 2022	29:36
517	"The Divided Dial"	December 6, 2022	46:15
518	"Mini-Stories: Volume 15"	December 13, 2022	37:16
519	"Balikbayan Boxes"	December 21, 2022	36:57

=== 2023 ===
No.	Title	Original release date	Running time
520	"Mini-Stories: Volume 16"	January 10, 2023	33:50
521	"A Sea of Yellow"	January 17, 2023	34:07
522	"The Comrades"	January 24, 2023	42:05
523	"Six-on-Six Basketball"	January 31, 2023	41:48
524	"The Day the Music Stopped"	February 7, 2023	50:58
525	"The Chinatown Punk Wars"	February 14, 2023	43:14
526	"Orange Alternative"	February 21, 2023	32:16
527	"RoboUmp"	February 28, 2023	27:40
528	"A Whale-Oiled Machine"	March 14, 2023	34:38
529	"The Wilderness Tool"	March 21, 2023	44:23
530	"The Panopticon Effect"	March 28, 2023	37:11
531	"De Fiets Is Niets"	April 4, 2023	43:55
532	"For a Dollar and a Dream"	April 11, 2023	39:07
533	"Dear John and Roman"	April 18, 2023	05:18
534	"For Amusement Only (Free Replay)"	April 25, 2023	29:55
535	"Craptions"	May 2, 2023	32:41
536	"Nuts and Bolts"	May 9, 2023	37:43
537	"Paved Paradise"	May 16, 2023	26:48
538	"Train Set: Track Three"	May 23, 2023	31:17
539	"Courtroom Sketch"	June 6, 2023	36:56
540	"The Siren of Scrap Metal"	June 13, 2023	34:37
541	"The Frankfurt Kitchen"	June 20, 2023	34:23
542	"Player Piano"	June 27, 2023	53:29
543	"In Proximity: Ryan Coogler and Roman Mars"	July 4, 2023	30:23
544	"Chick Tracts"	July 11, 2023	34:59
545	"Shade Redux"	July 18, 2023	29:50
546	"The Country of the Blind"	July 25, 2023	47:38
547	"Cooking with Gas"	August 1, 2023	29:01
548	"Trail Mix"	August 8, 2023	35:06
549	"Trail Mix: Track Two"	August 15, 2023	34:07
550	"Melanie Speaks"	August 22, 2023	50:26
551	"Office Space"	August 29, 2023	32:55
552	"Blood in the Machine"	September 12, 2023	30:11
553	"Cautionary Tales of the Sydney Opera House"	September 19, 2023	40:32
554	"Devil in the Details"	September 25, 2023	64:41
555	"The Big Dig"	October 3, 2023	62:16
556	"You Ain't Nothing but a Postmark"	October 6, 2023	39:18
557	"Model Village"	October 24, 2023	43:17
558	"The Fever Tree Hunt"	October 31, 2023	48:17
559	"The Six-Week Cure"	November 5, 2023	41:44
560	"Home on the Range"	November 12, 2023	45:42
561	"Long Strange Tape"	November 19, 2023	41:07
562	"Breaking Down the Power Broker with Conan O'Brien"	December 5, 2023	64:42
563	"Empire of the Sum"	December 12, 2023	40:43
564	"Mini-Stories: Volume 17"	December 19, 2023	56:11

=== 2024 ===
No.	Title	Category	Original release date	Running time
565	"Mini Stories: Volume 18"	History	January 9, 2024	41:55
566	"Imitation Nation"	Cities	January 16, 2024	41:52
BRPB–01	"The Power Broker #1: Robert Caro"	Cities	January 18, 2024	1:42:05
567	"The Double Kick"	Objects	January 23, 2024	58:48
GX–01	"Roman Mars Describes Chicago As It Is"	Technology	January 26, 2024	37:07
568	"Don't Forget to Remember"	Infrastructure	January 30, 2024	46:30
569	"Between the Blocks"	Cities	February 2, 2024	40:27
570	"White Castle System of Eating Houses"	Architecture	February 13, 2024	49:50
BRPB–02	"The Power Broker #2: Jamelle Bouie"	Cities	February 16, 2024	1:54:02
571	"You Are What You Watch"	-	February 20, 2024	35:43
GX–02	"Roman Mars Describes Sante Fe As It Is"	History	March 1, 2024	33:21
572	"WARNING: This Podcast Contains Chemicals Known to the State of California to Cause Cancer or Other Reproductive Harm"	Visuals	March 5, 2024	49:37
573	"Toyetic"	Visuals	March 12, 2024	38:26
BRPB–03	"The Power Broker #3: David Sims"	Cities	March 15, 2024	2:17:02
574	"The Monster Under the Sink"	Technology	March 19, 2024	32:19
575	"Autism Pleasantville"	Cities	March 26, 2024	38:00
GX–03	"Roman Mars Describes Athens, GA As It Is"	Cities	March 29, 2024	36:50
576	"Chambre de Bonne"	Architecture	April 2, 2024	39:41
577	"The Society of Ambiance Makers and Elegant Persons"	History	April 9, 2024	39:59
578	"Anything's Pastable: Eat, Sauté, Love"	History	April 16, 2024	41:04
BRPB–04	"The Power Broker #4: Alexandria Ocasio-Cortez"	Cities	April 19, 2024	2:49:54
579	"Tower of Silence"	Architecture	April 23, 2024	1:08:14
580	"Mr. Yuk"	Visuals	April 30, 2024	1:02:57
581	"It's Howdy Doody Time"	History	May 07, 2024	43:27
582	"Rocket Man"	Technology	May 14, 2024	43:27
BRPB–05	"The Power Broker #5: Brandy Zadrozny"	Cities	May 17, 2024	2:22:36
583	"The Lost Subways of North America"	Infrastructure	May 21, 2024	33;19
584	"Fact Checking the Supreme Court"	History	June 04, 2024	50:50
585	"The Los Angeles Leaf Blower war"	Objects	June 11, 2024	42:066
586	"Category 6"	Infrastructure	June 18, 2024	45:44
BRPB–06	"The Power Broker #6: Mike Schur"	Cities	June 21, 2024	3:09:14
587	"Vaping Wars"	Objects	June 25, 2024	58:54
588	"As Slow As Possible"	Sounds	July 9, 2024	49:13
589	"A River Runs Through Los Angeles"	Cities	July 16, 2024	50:10
BRPB–07	"The Power Broker #6: Sec. Pete Buttigieg"	Cities	July 19, 2024	2:52:32
590	"The 2024 Olympics Spectacular"	History	July 23, 2024	46:42
591	"The Art of the Olympics"	History	July 30, 2024	40:42
592	"Top Billing"	History	August 06, 2024	46:45
593	"Side Projects"	History	August 13, 2024	1:11:46
BRPB–08	"The Power Broker #8: Shiloh Frederick"	Cities	August 16, 2024	2:22:26
NBFT–01	"Not Built for This: The Bottom of the Bowl"	Infrastructure	August 20, 2024	34:25
NBFT–02	"Not Built for This: The Ripple Effect"	Infrastructure	August 23, 2024	63:46
NBFT–03	"Not Built for This: The Price Is Wrong"	Infrastructure	August 27, 2024	55:28
NBFT–04	"Unbuilding the Terrace"	Infrastructure	August 30, 2024	53:37
NBFT–05	"The Little Levee That Could"	Infrastructure	September 3, 2024	54:36
NBFT–06	"Maximum Temperature"	Infrastructure	September 6, 2024	47:21
594	"Medellin, Revisited"	Cities	September 10, 2024	39:53
595	"Planet Money: Zombie 2nd Mortgages"	Infrastructure	September 17, 2024	39:16
BRPB–09	"The Power Broker #9: Majora Carter"	Cities	September 20, 2024	2:41:45
596	"Cue the Sun!"	History	September 24, 2024	41:22
597	"The Infernal Machine"	History	October 1, 2024	35:21
598	"Christiania"	Cities	October 8, 2024	46:25
PNC–01	"Brilliantly Boring"	Cities	October 11, 2024	27:04
599	"Trompe L'oiel"	Cities	October 15, 2024	38:50
BRPB–10	"The Power Broker #10: Clara Jeffery"	Cities	October 18, 2024	3:03:08
600	"Spirit Halloween"	Cities	October 22, 2024	38:20
601	"How the World Ran Out of Everything"	History	October 29, 2024	40:20
602	"Meet Me at Riis"	Cities	November 5, 2024	41:43
603	"The Memory Palace...Book"	History	November 12, 2024	40:06
BRPB–11	"The Power Broker #11: Brennan Lee Mulligan"	Cities	November 15, 2024	3:00:09
604	"Roman, Elliot and Robert Caro: Live in Conversation"	Cities	November 19, 2024	50:45
605	"The 15 Minute City"	Cities	December 3, 2024	42:22
606	"The Flop House: Megalopolis, with Roman Mars"	-	December 10, 2024	1:53:20
607	"Mini-Stories: Volume 19"	History	December 17, 2024	41:24
BRPB–12	"The Power Broker #12: Robert Caro"	Cities	December 20, 2024	2:38:35
608	"New Year, New Neighborhood"	Cities	December 24, 2024	38:30
609	"Hyperfixed: Dylan's Supermarket Cold Case"	Architecture	December 31, 2024	31:54

=== 2025 ===
No.	Title	Category	Original release date	Running time
610	"Mini Stories: Volume 20"	History	January 7, 2025	40:31
611	"Ancient DMs"	Objects	January 14, 2025	40:17
612	"Sanctuary"	Cities	January 21, 2025	58:18
PB–Bonus	"The Power Broker Breakdown Breakdown"	History	January 24, 2025	23:17
613	"Valley So Low"	Cities	January 28, 2025	40:09
614	"The Wide Open"	History	February 4, 2025	1:07:30
615	"Your Own Personal Jesus"	Objects	February 11, 2025	37:01
PB–Wrap	"The Power Broker Breakdown Wrap-Up"	History	February 14, 2025	1:07:09
616	"The Nazi Block"	Architecture	February 18, 2025	41:55
617	"The Brutalists"	Architecture	February 25, 2025	43:17
618	"A Beetle By Any Other Name"	History	March 4, 2025	32:37
619	"What We're Reading"	Objects	March 11, 2025	40:26
620	"Beautiful West Oakland, California"	-	March 18, 2025	37:09
621	"Secret Mall Apartment"	Architecture	March 25, 2025	1:01:46
622	"The Great American Pyramid"	History	April 1, 2025	42:35
Bonus	"A Walking Tour with Mr. Memphis"	Cities	April 4, 2025	30:20
623	"Everything Is Tuberculosis"	History	April 8, 2025	35:19
624	"I've Got 1099 Problems"	History	April 15, 2025	39:22
625	"One-Nil to the Arsenal"	Sounds	April 22, 2025	38:45
626	"😅⚖️ (Emoji Law)"	Visuals	May 6, 2025	34:06
627	"Fishing in the Night"	Sounds	May 13, 2025	51:39
628	"Foreign in a Domestic Sense"	Objects	May 20, 2025	44:01
629	"Build, Interrupted: A Conversation with Ezra Klein"	Cities	May 27, 2025	50:35
630	"Adapt or Design"	Objects	June 2, 2025	38:39
631	"Return of Con Law"	History	June 10, 2025	63:51
632	"The Titanic's Best Lifeboat"	History	June 24, 2025	38:16
633	"Open Borders"	Cities	July 1, 2025	35:38
634	"Food Deserts"	Cities	July 8, 2025	44:23
GYG–01	"Roman Mars's Guide to San Francisco"	Cities	July 11, 2025	30:18
635	"Neil Young's iPod Killer"	Objects	July 15, 2025	36:38
636	"The Quiet Storm"	Sounds	July 22, 2025	46:12
CL–01	"Constitution Breakdown #1: Nikole Hannah-Jones"	History	July 25, 2025	1:29:26
637	"Air-Borne"	History	July 29, 2025	46:29
638	"Sister Aimee and the Birth of the Megachurch"	Architecture	August 12, 2025	41:58
639	"All About the Bass"	Sounds	August 19, 2025	29:52
640	"Ambassador Bridge"	Infrastructure	August 26, 2025	44:14
641	"The 99% Invisible Anniversary Special: 15 for 15"	History	September 2, 2025	55:45
642	"Replaceable you"	Technology	September, 2025	38:05
643	"The New Jungle"	History	September 23, 2025	39:07
CL–02	"Constitutional Breakdown #2: Rep. Sharice Davids"	History	September 26, 2025	1:22:45
BRPB–13	"The Power Broker #13: Drop Dead City"	Cities	September 30, 2025	54:58
-	"Get Played with Roman Mars and Ben Brock Johnson"	Objects	October 3, 2025	43:24
HL–01	"Hidden Levels #1: Mr. Boomshakalaka"	Objects	October 7, 2025	37:16
HL–02	"Hidden Levels #2: Stick it to 'Em"	Objects	October 10, 2025	41:36
HL–03	"Hidden Levels #3: The Game Wants YOU"	Objects	October 14, 2025	44:09
HL–04	"Hidden Levels #4: Machinima"	Objects	October 17, 2025	45:08
HL–05	"Hidden Levels #5: Press B to Touch Glass"	Objects	October 21, 2025	41:47
HL–06	"Hidden Levels #6: Segagaga"	Objects	October 24, 2025	41:20
644	"Your Call Is Important to Us"	Technology	October 28, 2025	30:03
CL–03	"Constitution Breakdown #3: Sen. Elizabeth Warren"	History	October 31, 2025	1:10:06
645	"Gear (Articles of Interest)"	Objects	November 4, 2025	59:10
646	"How to Write a Joke"	Objects	November 11, 2025	31:20
647	"The Moving Walkway Is Ending"	Technology	November 18, 2025	39:38
648	"Murderland"	Cities	November 25, 2025	27:59
CL–04	"Constitution Breakdown #4: Janet Napolitano"	History	November 28, 2025	1:22:21
649	"U Is for Urbanism"	History	December 2, 2025	42:21
650	"The Checkerboard"	Infrastructure	December 9, 2025	42:01
651	"Sax Appeal"	Objects	December 16, 2025	48:07
652	"Mini Stories: Volume 21"	Objects	December 16, 2025	33:50
CL–05	"Constitutional Breakdown #5: Dr. Tom Frieden "	History	December 26, 2025	1:26:16
653	"Beyond the 99% Invisible City"	Objects	December 30, 2025	44:48

=== 2026 ===
No.	Title	Category	Original release date	Running time
654	"Mini Stories: Volume 22"	Objects	January 6, 2026	33:25
655	"Exit Interview With Michael Bierut"	Objects	January 6, 2026	36:00
656	"Audio Flux"	Sounds	January 20, 2026	37:24
657	"What's in a Name"	History	January 27, 2026	26:30
CL–06	"Constitution Breakdown #6: Adam Liptak"	History	January 30, 2026	60:43
658	"The Em Dash"	Visuals	February 3, 2026	39:22
659	"Molar City"	Cities	February 17, 2026	41:59
660	"The Longest Fence in the World"	History	February 24, 2026	31:33
CL–07	"Constitution Breakdown #7: California AG Rob Bonta"	History	February 27, 2026	1:17:49
661	"Where the F*** Are We?"	History	March 3, 2026	47:12
662	"A Man, a Plan, a Canal — Mars!"	History	March 10, 2026	32:40
SR–01	"Service Request #1: What Happens When I Call 311?"	Infrastructure	March 17, 2026	34:57
SR–02	"Service Request #2: Why Is This Red Light So Damn Long?"	Infrastructure	March 24, 2026	28:01
CL–08	"Constitution Breakdown #8: Jill Lepore"	History	March 27, 2026	1:15:40
SR–03	"Service Request #3: Why Is There So Much Litter in San Francisco?"	Infrastructure	March 31, 2026	34:24
SR–04	"Service Request #4: How Does the Grid in Phoenix Work?"	Infrastructure	April 3, 2026	38:10
