= European French =

Set of varieties of the French language

European French (French: français d'Europe, français européen) is the variety of French spoken in Europe in French speaking countries or areas.

In Europe, French is spoken by 71 million native speakers, making French the third most spoken native language in Europe after Russian and German and 210 million Europeans can speak French, making French the second most spoken language in Europe after English.

== Geographic distribution ==
Knowledge of French in the European Union and candidate countries

Among varieties of European French:

- French of France, the predominant variety of the French language in France, Monaco and Andorra
- Belgian French, the variety of French language spoken mainly in the French Community of Belgium
- Swiss French, the variety spoken in the French-speaking area of Switzerland
- Luxembourg French, the variety spoken in the French-speaking area of Luxembourg
- Jersey Legal French, the official dialect of French used administratively in Jersey.
- Aostan French, the variety of French spoken in the Aosta Valley, Italy.

== See also ==
- Euro English
