= The Funniest Joke in the World =

Monty Python sketch

"The Funniest Joke in the World" (also "Joke Warfare" and "Killer Joke") is a Monty Python comedy sketch revolving around a joke that is so funny that anyone who reads or hears it promptly dies from laughter. Ernest Scribbler (Michael Palin), a British "manufacturer of jokes", writes the joke on a piece of paper only to die laughing. His mother (Eric Idle) also immediately dies laughing after reading it, as do the first constables on the scene. Eventually the joke is contained, weaponised, and deployed against Germany during World War II.

The sketch appeared in the first episode of the television show Monty Python's Flying Circus ("Whither Canada"), first shown on 5 October 1969. It appeared in altered forms in several later Python works. The German translation of the joke in the sketch is made of various meaningless, German-sounding nonsense words, and so it does not have an English translation.

== Synopsis ==
The sketch is framed in a documentary style and opens with Ernest Scribbler (Michael Palin), a British "manufacturer of jokes", creating and writing the funniest joke in the world on a piece of paper, only to die laughing. His mother (Eric Idle) finds the joke, thinks it is a suicide note, reads it and also immediately dies laughing. Aware of the deadly nature of the joke, a brave Scotland Yard inspector (Graham Chapman) attempts to retrieve the joke, aided by the playing of very sombre music on gramophone records and the chanting of laments by fellow policemen to create a depressing atmosphere. The inspector leaves the house with the joke in hand, but also dies from laughter.

The British Army are soon eager to determine "the military potential of the Killer Joke". They test the joke on a short-sighted rifleman (Terry Jones), who suppresses a laugh and falls dead on the range. After confirming its "devastating effectiveness at a range of up to 50 yards", they then translate it into German, with each translator working on only one word of the joke for their own safety (one translator saw two words of the joke and had to be hospitalised for several weeks). The German "translation" (in reality mostly just nonsense words) is used for the first time on 8 July 1944 in the Ardennes, causing German soldiers to fall down dead from laughter:

Wenn ist das Nunstück git und Slotermeyer? Ja! Beiherhund das Oder die Flipperwaldt gersput!

The German version is described as being "over 60,000 times as powerful as Britain's great pre-war joke" (at this point a newsreel of Prime Minister Neville Chamberlain waving his "piece of paper" appears on screen). The joke is then used in open warfare, with Tommies running through an open field amid artillery fire while shouting the joke at the Germans, who die laughing in response. Afterward, a German field hospital is shown with bandaged German soldiers on stretchers, convulsing with laughter, presumably having heard some parts of the joke. In a subsequent scene, a British officer from the Joke Brigade (Palin) has been taken prisoner and is being interrogated by Gestapo officers. The British officer uses the joke to escape as his German captors die laughing, with one German officer (Cleese) insisting that the joke isn't funny. He then cracks up and utters a Woody Woodpecker-style laugh, before expiring.

The Germans attempt counter-jokes, but each attempt is found unsuccessful, with unamused Gestapo officers executing the hapless scientists as a consequence. For example, a film is shown of Adolf Hitler supposedly telling the joke while giving a speech. It is translated to "My dog has no nose", then a German soldier asking "How does he smell?", with Hitler replying, "Awful!". Eventually their best "V-joke" (in reference to the V-weapons) is attempted on a radio broadcast to British households: "Der ver zwei peanuts, valking down der Straße, und von vas assaulted...peanut. Ohohohoho!" Although the joke is followed triumphantly by the German anthem "Deutschland über alles", the attack is ineffective, and merely confuses any Britons listening.

The British joke is said to have been laid to rest when "peace broke out" at the end of the war, and countries agree to a joke warfare ban at the Geneva Convention. In 1950, the last copy of the joke is sealed under a monument in the Berkshire countryside, bearing the inscription "To the Unknown Joke". Thus, the English version of the joke is never revealed to the audience.

== Hitler footage from the sketch in reality ==
The footage of Adolf Hitler is taken from Leni Riefenstahl's film Triumph of the Will. The section (about 34 minutes into the film) where Konstantin Hierl presents the Reichsarbeitsdienst to Hitler is the source of the speech used for the joke. The first clip shows Hitler saying Insbesondere keiner mehr in Deutschland leben wird... ("In particular, no one will live in Germany anymore [without working for their country]"), subtitled "My dog has no nose". The crowd (led by Hitler Youth leader Baldur von Schirach) saying: "How does he smell?" is from a scene just before Hitler's speech; the original German is Wir sind des Reiches junge Mannschaft!, "We are the Reich's young men!" The punchline of the joke "Awful" is the next shot that shows Hitler's face. The original words are eure Schule, from "[The whole nation will go through] your school".

== Influence, and other works ==
Jim Carrey is a fan of Monty Python. He described how Ernest Scribbler, played by Michael Palin, laughing himself to death in the sketch, had a huge effect on his early years.

The sketch was later remade in a shorter version for the film And Now for Something Completely Different. It is also available on the CD-ROM video game version of the film Monty Python's The Meaning of Life.

== See also ==
- Death from laughter
- Infinite Jest
- Nothing but Gingerbread Left
- The Zahir
