= Ray cat =

Proposed nuclear radiation-detecting cat

The ray cat's appearance would change in the presence of radiation, perhaps by glowing green.

A ray cat (Note: French: radiochat; German: Strahlenkatze. Sometimes radiation cat in later sources.) is a proposed kind of cat that would be genetically engineered to change appearance in the presence of nuclear radiation. Philosophers Françoise Bastide and Paolo Fabbri originated the idea of a "living radiation detector" in 1984 as a proposed long-term nuclear waste warning message that could be understood 10,000 years in the future, building on the Human Interference Task Force's idea of oral transmission of radiation's dangers. Bastide and Fabbri did not specify a particular animal to be used, but coined the term "ray cat" to illustrate how name choice could convey the animal's function. They also did not specify how the animals' appearance should change, but ray cats are often conceived of as either changing color or glowing.

There is no evidence that the United States government ever seriously considered the "living radiation detector" proposal, and no radiation-detecting cats have ever been engineered, although in 2015 a lab in Montreal created the Ray Cat Solution movement in an attempt to begin designing them. The idea of ray cats has gained popular-culture notoriety, including inspiring a song that is meant to be optimally catchy so as to persist for 10,000 years. A 2019 report by the Nuclear Energy Agency concluded that Bastide and Fabbri succeeded at their real goal, raising awareness about the difficulties of dealing with radioactive waste.

== Proposal ==
The United States Department of Energy's Human Interference Task Force, formed in 1981, sought ways to keep humans from inadvertently encountering radioactive waste stored at sites like the Yucca Mountain nuclear waste repository. The task force suggested "oral transmission" as a means of preserving warnings for future generations. Thomas Sebeok, the linguist consulted by the Human Interference Task Force, proposed in a separate report the seeding and nurturing of a body of folklore around Yucca Mountain, with annual rituals to spread the stories forward—a so-called atomic priesthood.

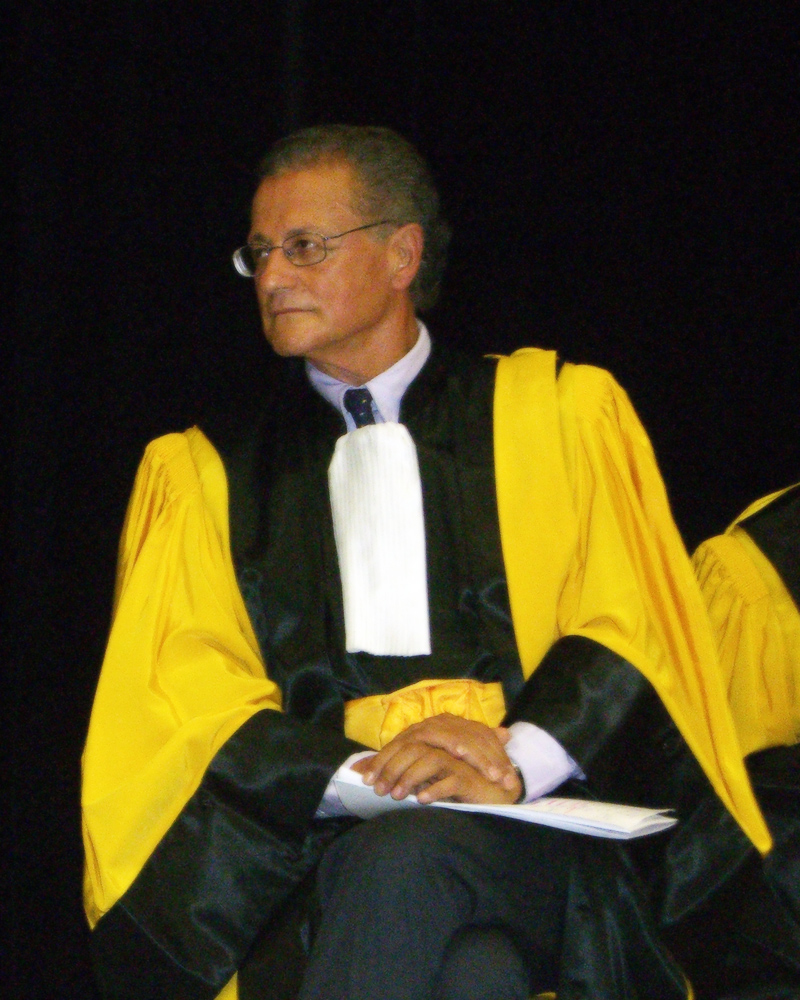
Paolo Fabbri in 2013

In 1984, the German journal Zeitschrift für Semiotik ('Journal of Semiotics') published 12 responses from academics that speculated about how to communicate 10,000 years into the future. One proposal came from philosophers Françoise Bastide and Paolo Fabbri, who suggested creating a "living radiation detector" in the form of some species that would persist alongside humans, giving the hypothetical of a species of cat that would be called ray cats, the name meant to convey their purpose even as language evolved. Bastide and Fabbri did not recommend any particular type of change in appearance, but pointed to the skin condition xeroderma pigmentosum as an example of a mutation which makes marks on the skin upon exposure to radiation. This approach has been referred to as a "feline Geiger counter". They further proposed inventing a body of folklore, passed on through proverbs and myths, to explain that people should flee when a cat changes color.

== Cultural impact ==
The proposition included the seeding and nurturing of a body of folklore around nuclear waste sites, with annual rituals to spread the stories forward—a so-called atomic priesthood.

The proposal, which has been characterized as playful, was discussed in 2014 in "Ten Thousand Years", an episode of the design podcast 99% Invisible about long-term nuclear waste storage, part of a wave of attention the idea received. Reporter Matthew Kielty said:

10,000 years from now, these songs or these stories may sound incomprehensible to us, but as long as they communicate this idea that it's not safe to be where the cats change colors, we will have done our job. May the ray cats keep us safe.

"10,000-Year Earworm to Discourage Settlement Near Nuclear Waste Repositories (Don't Change Color, Kitty)"

Song by Emperor X

from the album 10,000-Year Earworm to Discourage Settlement Near Nuclear Waste Repositories
- Released: May 12, 2014
- Genre: Folk
- Length: 1:54
- Songwriter: Emperor X

99% Invisible commissioned Emperor X to write a song for the episode which could serve as a potential work of ray cat folklore. Emperor X, a former science teacher, says he was told to make the song "so catchy and annoying that it might be handed down from generation to generation over a span of 10,000 years". He titled the resulting work "10,000-Year Earworm to Discourage Settlement Near Nuclear Waste Repositories (Don't Change Color, Kitty)" (sometimes referred to by just its subtitle), an earworm being a song that sticks in someone's head. The song has fast-paced, repetitive lyrics, beginning:

Don't change color, kitty.
Keep your color, kitty.
Stay that pretty gray.
Don't change color, kitty.
Keep your color, kitty.
Keep sickness away.

Dagens Nyheter in 2022 noted that the song had only 48,000 listens on Spotify; Emperor X grants that the song is "very unlikely" to ever be used for its ostensible purpose, but sees it as something that will make people think more about the issue of nuclear waste storage. Kate Golembiewski of Atlas Obscura referred to the song as a "bop" and Ariel Schwartz of Business Insider called it "catchy".

99% Invisible (which is based in Oakland, California, United States) also sold T-shirts for a fictional baseball team, the Oakland Raycats.

In the 2015 documentary short "The Ray Cat Solution", French filmmaker Benjamin Huguet interviewed Fabbri, as well as Kielty of 99% Invisible. The film shows Fabbri listening to Emperor X's song and receiving an Oakland Raycats T-shirt.

== Attempts at realizing ==
It was not possible in 1984 to genetically engineer cats in the manner proposed. In 2015, Bricobio, a Montreal-based biology lab, created the Ray Cat Solution movement, which seeks to engineer cats that can change color in response to radiation or other stimuli and runs a website promoting the idea of ray cats. Ideas for creating ray cats have included harnessing bioluminescence (which occurs in some species but not cats) or enzyme interactions. Bricobio has expressed a plan to work first on bacteria, then nematodes, and then cats. Their website describes the plan as completely serious and contemplates other potential applications for color-changing cats, such as detecting exposure to toxic chemicals.

== Impact on semiotics ==
The Department of Energy never implemented the ray cat proposal, and it is unlikely it ever seriously considered it; plans for storing waste at Yucca Mountain were scrapped in 2010, while the Waste Isolation Pilot Plant opted for granite monuments and buried libraries in the languages of the United Nations and Navajo. Nonetheless, the proposal has prompted further discussion in the field of nuclear semiotics and in semiotics more generally. Mattia Thibault and Gabriele Marino wrote in the International Journal for the Semiotics of Law in 2018 that the ray cat constituted a "possible soteriologic figure". Thibault later wrote in Linguistic Frontiers—immediately preceding an English translation of Bastide and Fabbri's 1984 paper—that, prior to the ray cat proposal gaining pop-culture attention in 2014, it had become a meme in the semiotics community, citing the 2018 paper. Thibault writes that the ray cat "is not a mere curiosity", but rather an idea that confronts questions both of communication with the future and communication in the future.

A 2019 Nuclear Energy Agency report credited Kielty with reviving awareness in the almost-forgotten concept and cited the subsequent spread of the idea including "Don't Change Color, Kitty", "The Ray Cat Solution", and Bricobio's efforts. The report found that Bastide and Fabbri "achieved their goal after all. Their proposal was perhaps less about engineering the actual Ray Cat, and more about creating a symbol meant to achieve maximal awareness and reflectivity about the existence of radioactive waste and the challenge of [records, knowledge, and memory] preservation in society."

== Bibliography ==
=== Primary sources ===
- Bricobio (n.d.). 10,000. The Ray Cat Solution. Archived from the original on 19 April 2016.
- Bastide, Françoise; Fabbri, Paolo (1984). "Lebende Detektoren und komplementäre Zeichen: Katzen, Augen und Sirenen" [Living detectors and complementary signs: Cats, eyes, and sirens]. Zeitschrift für Semiotik [Journal of Semiotics] (in German). 6 (3). Berlin: Deutschen Gesellschaft für Semiotik. Archived from the original on 7 May 2020.
  - Republished in English as: Fabbri, Paolo; Bastide, Françoise (1 December 2022) [1984]. "Living detectors and complementary signs: cats, eyes, and sirens". Linguistic Frontiers. 5 (3). Translated by Feil, Sebastian. Sciendo: 10–13. doi:10.2478/lf-2022-0008.
- Emperor X (12 May 2014). "10,000-Year Earworm to Discourage Settlement Near Nuclear Waste Repositories, by Emperor X". Archived from the original on 8 November 2020 – via Bandcamp.

=== Secondary sources (scholarly) ===
- Nuclear Energy Agency (2019). Preservation of Records, Knowledge and Memory (RK&M) Across Generations: Final Report of the RK&M Initiative (PDF) (Report). Organisation for Economic Co-operation and Development. Archived (PDF) from the original on 20 May 2023.
- Esquivel-Sada, Daphne (June 2017). Un labo à soi: L'idéologie DIYbio de démocratie des biotechnologies et la conjonction entre facultés manuelles et autonomie [A lab of one's own: The DIYbio ideology of biotechnology democracy and the conjunction between manual skills and autonomy] (PDF) (Ph.D. thesis) (in French). Université de Montréal.
- Hauser, Susanne, ed. (1984). "Und in alle Ewigkeit: Kommunikation über 10 000 Jahre: Wie sagen wir unsern Kindeskindern wo der Atommüll liegt?" [And into Eternity... Communication over 10000s of Years: How Will We Tell our Children's Children Where the Nuclear Waste is?]. Zeitschrift für Semiotik (in German). 6 (3). Berlin: Deutschen Gesellschaft für Semiotik. ISSN 0170-6241. Archived from the original on 7 May 2020.
- Thibault, Mattia; Marino, Gabriele (September 2018). "Who Run the World? Cats: Cat Lovers, Cat Memes, and Cat Languages Across the Web". International Journal for the Semiotics of Law. 31 (3): 473–490. doi:10.1007/s11196-018-9559-8. hdl:2318/1713861. S2CID 255009164.
- Thibault, Mattia (1 December 2022). "Speculative Semiotics". Linguistic Frontiers (Editorial). 5 (3). Sciendo: 1–9. doi:10.2478/lf-2022-0012. This article incorporates text from this free content work. Licensed under CC-BY 4.0.

=== Secondary sources (other) ===
- Beauchamp, Scott (24 February 2015). "How to Send a Message 1,000 Years to the Future". The Atlantic. Archived from the original on 26 February 2015.
- Golembiewski, Kate (25 October 2022). "Can Glowing 'Ray Cats' Save Humanity?". Atlas Obscura. Archived from the original on 9 March 2024.
- Haslett, Emma (24 November 2014). "Raycats and earworms: How scientists are using colour-changing cats and nursery rhymes to warn future generations of nuclear danger". City A.M. Archived from the original on 12 November 2020.
- Huguet, Benjamin (10 September 2015). The Ray Cat Solution (Documentary short) (in English and French). Aeon Video. Archived from the original on 20 April 2016 – via Vimeo.
- Lenas, Sverker (28 January 2022). "Slutförvaret: Så ska eftervärlden varnas för kärnavfallet". Dagens Nyheter (in Swedish). Archived from the original on 28 January 2022.
- Mancini, Donato Paolo (8 January 2017). "How colour-changing cats might warn future humans of radioactive waste". The Guardian. Archived from the original on 17 January 2023.
- Mars, Roman (host); Kielty, Matthew (reporter) (12 May 2014). "Ten Thousand Years". 99% Invisible (Podcast). Public Radio Exchange. Event occurs at 21:16–23:30, 25:54–26:43. Archived from the original on 8 January 2023.
- Meier, Allison (21 July 2016). "A Nuclear Warning Designed to Last 10,000 Years". Hyperallergic. Archived from the original on 9 March 2024.
- Piesing, Mark (3 August 2020). "How to build a nuclear warning for 10,000 years' time". BBC Future. Archived from the original on 11 September 2021.
- Schwartz, Ariel (16 August 2015). "Color-changing cats were once part of a US government plan to protect humankind". Business Insider. Archived from the original on 17 April 2016.
- Zhang, Sarah (November 2014). "The Cat Went Over Radioactive Mountain". Method. Archived from the original on 9 October 2021. This article incorporates text from this free content work. Licensed under CC-BY 3.0 US (license statement/permission).
