= Emperor X =

American singer and songwriter

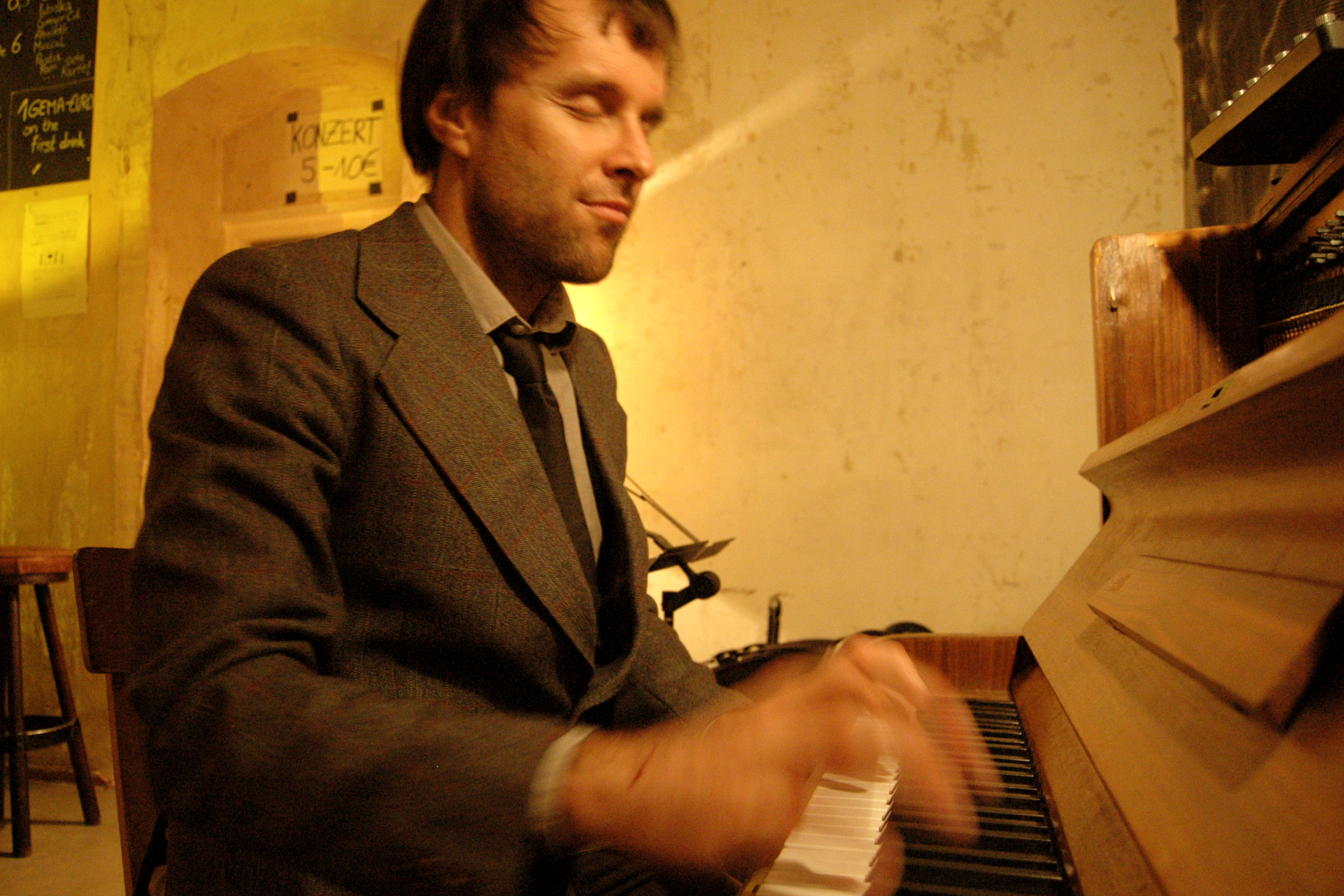
- Matheny in 2016

Background information
- Born: Chad Randall Matheny; April 8, 1979 (age 47); Louisville, Kentucky, United States
- Origin: Jacksonville, Florida, United States
- Genres: Alternative; noise pop; noise rock; lo-fi; folk; indie folk; filk
- Occupations: Singer; songwriter
- Instruments: Guitar; keyboard; vocals
- Years active: 1998–present
- Labels: Bar/None Records; Discos Mariscos; Snowglobe Records; Bakery Outlet Records; Burnt Toast Vinyl; Plan-It-X Records; Tiny Engines; Dreams of Field Recordings
- Website: www.emperorx.net

Chad Randall Matheny, known professionally as Emperor X, is an American singer and songwriter. He has been based in Berlin, Germany since 2012.

== Early life and career ==
Born in Louisville, Kentucky in 1979, Matheny got his start in music when he was given a Casio SK-1 by his grandparents at age nine, and recorded his first album on a Tascam four-track before the age of 20.

Matheny tours across the United States regularly and performs around the world as well, including tours in Mexico, Canada, Australia, the United Kingdom, and the European Union.

In a self-described attempt to "address the diminishing utility of physical copies of music and the expanding role of marketing in the experience of art", Matheny often hides or buries one-off physical copies and associated visual artwork of b-sides at GPS coordinates and posts them online as a part of a geocaching game to unlock MP3 copies of the audio. For the release of the 2011 Emperor X album Western Teleport, 41 "translucent purple audio cassettes" were buried across North America, many of which remain undiscovered. This received a feature on NPR's "Weekend Edition" program.

In 2012, he left the United States for Berlin, where he found that the country's trains helped him tour easier as a near-blind musician.

In 2014, Matheny was commissioned by 99% Invisible to write a song titled "10,000-Year Earworm to Discourage Settlement Near Nuclear Waste Repositories (Don't Change Color, Kitty)" based on Françoise Bastide and Paolo Fabbri's concept of a millennia-long nuclear waste warning message in the form of a folk song about genetically engineered cats. Matheny wrote it to be "so catchy and annoying that it might be handed down from generation to generation over a span of 10,000 years".

In 2020, Matheny and Christian Holden from The Hotelier started an artist-managed record label cooperative known as Dreams of Field Recordings.

== Personal life ==
Matheny is a former high school science teacher, and in 2004 he stopped his pursuit of a master's degree in physics in order to dedicate his career to music.

Matheny is a testicular cancer survivor and has very low vision, which makes him unable to legally drive. His low vision is due to a condition he was born with which affects muscles in the eye and this was worsened by a car accident in 1994 when he was a teenager, and it caused the vision in his right eye to deteriorate considerably.

== Discography ==
=== Full-length albums ===
- The Joytakers' Rakes/Stars on the Ceiling, Pleasantly Kneeling (1998, self-released)
- Tectonic Membrane/Thin Strip on an Edgeless Platform (2004, Discos Mariscos)
- Central Hug/Friendarmy/Fractaldunes (2005, Discos Mariscos)
- The Blythe Archives Volume One (2008, Burnt Toast Vinyl)
- The Blythe Archives Volume Two (2009, self-released)
- Western Teleport (2011, Bar/None Records)
- Nineteen Live Recordings (2013, Plan-It-X Records, re-released in 2020 on Dreams of Field Recordings)
- Jetzt Christmas (2013)
- The Orlando Sentinel (2014, The Bomber Jacket)
- Oversleepers International (2017, Tiny Engines)
- The Lakes of Zones B and C (2022)
- Unified Field (2026)

=== EPs and singles ===
- Wuss/Strike/River/Preacher/Magnet/God/Unwuss (2006)
- Dirt Dealership (2007)
- Defiance (for Elise Sunderhuse) (2010)
- Brown Recluse/At a Rave with Nicolas Sarkozy (2013)
- 10,000-Year Earworm to Discourage Resettlement Near Nuclear Waste Repositories (2014)
- Wasted on the Senate Floor (2016)
- Sad React (2020, Dreams of Field Recordings)
- United Earth League of Quarantine Aerobics (2020, Dreams of Field Recordings) – as Chad Matheny
- Suggested Improvements to Transportation Infrastructure in the Northeast Corridor (2023)
- Renee Nicole Nicole Renee (2026)
- Pissing With the Flashlight On (2026)

=== Tour-only releases ===
- Gasheater/Raytracer (2004)
- East Coast and Freedom From/Freedom To (2004)
- Everyone in Jacksonville (2006)
- Australia Tour Tape (2010)
- Several New Songs in Various Digital Formats (2011)
