= Palinacousis =

- Specialty: Neurology

Palinacousis is an auditory form of perseveration—continuing to hear a sound after the physical noise has disappeared. The condition is often associated with lesions of the temporal lobe.

== See also ==
- Earworm
