= Euro English =

Set of varieties of English used in Continental Europe

- European English
- English
- Native to: European Union; European Free Trade Association
- Region: Europe
- Ethnicity: Europeans
- Language family: Indo-European: Germanic; West Germanic; Ingvaeonic; Anglo-Frisian; Anglic; English; International English; European English; Jargon of the Institutions of the European Union and of the European Free Trade Association; Euro English
- Early forms: Proto-Indo-European: Proto-Germanic; Proto-West Germanic; Proto-English; Old English; Middle English; Early Modern English; Modern English
- Dialects: Glossary of European Union concepts, acronyms, and jargon
- Writing system: Latin (English alphabet); Unified English Braille

Language codes
- ISO 639-3: –
- Glottolog: None
- IETF: en-EU

Euro English, or European English (less commonly known as EU English, Continental English, and EU Speak), is a group of dialects of the English language and a form of International English as used in continental Europe based on common lexical and grammatical mistranslations influenced by the native languages of its non-native English-speaking population.

It can roughly be divided into Euro English and European English with Euro English being mostly built on the technical jargon of the European Union (EU) and the European Free Trade Association (EFTA). It is mostly used among EU staff, EFTA staff as well as European diplomats with a lower proficiency in English inclusive of both Standard English and non-standard native speaker dialects of English.

Expatriates, young international travelers such as international students in the EU's Erasmus Programme, migrants from EU and EFTA countries as well as global nomads speak European English, which does not contain as much bureaucratic terms as Euro English and is also more strongly influenced by other European languages, such as the Romance, Germanic and Slavic languages.

== History ==
The usage of the English language in other parts of Europe spread through the 19th century, when the British Empire inherited colonies elsewhere in Europe such as Malta, Cyprus, Gibraltar, Menorca, Heligoland, and the Ionian Islands, the latter three in modern-day Spain, Germany, and Greece respectively.

The term "Euro English" was first used by Carstensen in 1986 to denote the adoption of anglicisms in Europe.

The enlargement of the European Union over several decades gradually diluted the influence of two of the EU's other non-English working languages of German and French. The use of English in European Union institutions and the European Free Trade Association, the development of European Union law as identified in the "Glossary of European Union concepts, acronyms, and jargon", the integration of international business and trade practices among member states, the influence of the Legal English and Business English registers, and the increased mistranslation and coinage of technical, legal, international business, international relations, and public policy jargon by non-native speakers of English has led to the development of Euro English. The development of the international student exchange Erasmus Programme, an open borders travel policy establishing the Schengen Area, and the establishment of a customs union created a new class of mobile young people in Europe who needed a lingua franca to communicate across Europe, and English usually filled that role. Though as many times both participants in a conversation are not native speakers, second-language learning mistakes and other changes to the language, often are not corrected to the point of normalizing them, and thereby creating European English.

In 2006, Mollin rejected the idea that Euro English existed as an independent variety of English amongst European academics at the time. According to Forche (2012), "The question whether the appropriation of English by non-native speakers in Continental Europe is giving rise to a potential European variety of English has not yet been resolved." In his test group of Erasmus students, Forche found more evidence of Euro English than Mollin did amongst European academics. Many of the features suggested to be characteristic of Euro English could be identified as learners' mistakes, although there are some nativisation tendencies. Although these young mobile Europeans had a greater potential to shape a continental norm, they appeared to use English mostly for pragmatic reasons rather than as a language they strongly identified with, and there was still not enough evidence to conclude that Euro English constituted an independent variety.

Euro English was heavily influenced and dominated by British English, due to the United Kingdom having been an EU member state between 1973 and 2020. However, the UK's withdrawal in early 2020 means that the EU's scope of native English dialects has been mostly reduced to the varieties of Hiberno-English spoken in the Republic of Ireland; one source believes that this will allow room for Romance languages to have more of an influence on European English. There is also a possibility of a Romance language replacing English. After the UK withdrew from the EU, the Government of France wanted to encourage greater use of French as a working language, though not much has happened, as English has been more or less accepted as the de facto standard by all eastern European countries.

Mannoni (2021) found that both the Euro English as found in European Union law, as well as legal Chinese in Mainland China, were "hybrid languages".

According to 2023 surveys, about 47% of EU citizens, this being about 212 million in total numbers, were able to hold a conversation in English. Among the European youth (15–24 years old) this number was even higher, with 70% being able to hold a conversation in English, this being an increase of almost 10% of the total population when compared to 10 years ago. The way that European kids learn English is also changing. In the past, English was taught almost exclusively in school, as parents generally lacked English proficiency. Schools in almost all cases adhere to text books teaching British English. Now that this first generation of Europeans with good English proficiency is having kids themselves, it remains to be seen how this will affect the overall language learning process of the kids. Due to many Europeans with good English proficiency also consuming a sizable amount of non-British English media, a further influence of other English accents and idioms into inter European English usage is likely.

== Style guides ==
=== European Union and the European Free Trade Association ===
- English Style Guide: "A handbook for authors and translators in the European Commission" – executive branch of the European Union.
- Interinstitutional Style Guide -- used across several institutions of the European Union, European Economic Area, and the European Free Trade Association.

=== Council of Europe ===
- Council of Europe - English Style Guide, by the Council of Europe

=== Euro English in computers ===
The Unicode Common Locale Data Repository Project had drafted/defined "en-150" for English in Europe.

== Grammar ==
English is widely used on the European continent as an international language. Frequently conferences are conducted in English (and their proceedings published in English) when only a few of the participants are native speakers. At such conferences the English spoken often shows features at variance with the English of England but shared by the other speakers. Continental meanings of eventual and actual, continental uses of tenses, calques on French formulas of conference procedure, various details of pronunciation, and dozens of other features mark the English as an emerging continental norm. Native speakers attending the conference may find themselves using some of these features as the verbal interaction takes place.

— Charles A. Ferguson (1992)

=== Conjugation ===
Non-native English speakers frequently drop the third person singular suffix (-s). For example: he often call meetings.

Speakers of Euro English, in particular those from Eastern Europe, may use the progressive aspect with stative predicates, such as saying I'm coming from Spain instead of I come from Spain. This is atypical in Standard English, but it is permissible in Euro English.

=== Deixis ===
A construction that appears with very high frequency in European speakers of English is, for example, Euro English we were five people at the party, as opposed to Standard English there were five people at the party. Such constructions introduce a type of mandatory "clusivity" to the English language, in which the speaker always signifies whether they are a part of some bigger group.

Euro English also features slightly more frequent usage of the indefinite personal pronoun one, such as in one can protect one's country. This mirrors the more frequent usage of such pronouns in European languages, but is also sometimes used as third-person reflexive pronouns, such as with French on and se, Scandinavian sig and sin, German man and sich, etc.

=== Inflection ===
Some words are given a plural with a final "s" in Euro English, such as informations and competences, to match similar words in European languages (such as informations and compétences in French), while this pluralisation is ungrammatical in British or American English.

=== Register ===
It is extremely frequent among European speakers of English to prefer the singular they in formal contexts, whereas native English speakers in the US and UK have historically considered it an informal colloquialism. This mirrors the usage of "singular plurals", in terms of levels of formality, in European languages, such as French vous, German Sie, older Spanish vos, Danish and Norwegian De, even though all of these examples are strictly used in the second person.

== Vocabulary ==
Standard English	Euro English	Origin
possible	eventual	
agent, operator	actor	
to encourage	to incite	
opportunity	possibility	
to monitor	to control	
what is it called?	how is it called?	
billion	milliard	
trillion	billion	
private investigator	detective	
current	actual	The English adjective actual has undergone semantic shift and is now a false friend (cf. cognates in German aktuell, Dutch actueel, French actuel, Romanian/Spanish/Catalan/Galician actual, Portuguese a(c)tual, Italian attuale, Czech aktuální, Polish aktualny).
to plan for	to foresee	From French prévoir.
condition	conditionality	
six months	semester	
office	cabinet	
deadline	delay	From French délai, meaning "time limit, deadline; waiting period".
planning	planification	In imitation of a Romance language; compare French planification, Spanish planificación.
to skip, to refrain from	to hop over	Calqued from Swedish hoppa över.
to be naive	to be blue-eyed	Used in Nordic countries (and is understood by German speakers).
to overcharge	to salt	
to specify, to outline	to precise	From French and other Romance influence.

== See also ==
- British English
- English as a lingua franca
- Glossary of European Union concepts, acronyms, and jargon
- International English
- African English
- Indian English
- American English

== Bibliography ==
- Forche, Christian R. (2012). "On the emergence of Euro-English as a potential European variety of English – attitudes and interpretations". Jezikoslovlje. 23 (2): 447–478.
- Mannoni, Michele (2021). "Rights Metaphors Across Hybrid Legal Languages, Such as Euro English and Legal Chinese". International Journal for the Semiotics of Law. 34 (5). International Association for the Semiotics of Law: 1375–1399. doi:10.1007/s11196-020-09814-6. PMC 8019294. PMID 33840914.
- Mollin, Sandra (2006). Euro-English: Assessing Variety Status. Tübingen: Gunter Narr Verlag. p. 6. ISBN 382336250X.
