= Human Interference Task Force =

Task Force convened on behalf of the U.S. Department of Energy

The Human Interference Task Force was a team of engineers, anthropologists, nuclear physicists, behavioral scientists and others convened on behalf of the U.S. Department of Energy and Bechtel Corp. to find a way to reduce the likelihood of future humans unintentionally intruding on radioactive waste isolation systems.

== See also ==
- Hazard symbol – Warning symbol on locations or products
- Long-term nuclear waste warning messages – Messages to deter human intrusion at nuclear waste repositories in the far future
- Ray cat – Proposed nuclear radiation-detecting cat
