= Western Teleport =

Studio album by Emperor X
- Released: October 4, 2011
- Genres: Indie pop, indie folk, folktronica
- Length: 31:31
- Label: Bar/None Records

Emperor X chronology
Central Hug/FriendArmy/Fractaldunes (And the Dreams That Resulted) (2005)	Western Teleport (2011)	Nineteen Live Recordings (2013)

Western Teleport is an album by musician Emperor X (real name Chad Matheny), his first in six years. It was released on October 4, 2011 on Bar/None Records, and marks Emperor X's debut release for that label.

== Background and promotion ==
Matheny said Western Teleport's title was influenced by his "obsession" over technological advancements while he was living in California. He also described it as "a dark record from my average kind of record," adding that "It's coming out of a pretty dark, exploratory, sweaty, breathless place in my life."

To promote the album, Bar/None, with the help of the Alternative Distribution Alliance, buried 41 "nodes" at different random locations throughout North America. The nodes contain a cassette with either B-sides or early versions of songs on Western Teleport. Matheny has credited his inspiration for the idea of burying cassettes for others to find when he became concerned about the environmental impact of making multiple copies of the same album. Still, he wanted to preserve the organizational structure of an album. He later concluded that the best way to ensure that the physical musical recording had its own worth while also ensuring the music would be heard was to make just one copy of each song.

After NPR interviewed Matheny about this project in 2010, he caught the attention of Bar/None Records, which released the album the following year. The album's opening track, "Erica Western Teleport," has been described as "... a model example of the bummer jam template." Many people have also described the song as being relatable with regard to their own lives.

== Reception ==
Professional ratings
Aggregate scores
Source	Rating
Metacritic	(79%)
Review scores
Source	Rating
AllMusic	3.5/5 stars
Tiny Mix Tapes	3.5/5 stars
PopMatters	(8/10)
Robert Christgau	(A−)
Boston Phoenix	3.5/4 stars

The album received generally favorable reviews from music critics, and was ranked as one of the 10 most underrated albums of 2011 by Salon. Dan Weiss, one such critic, compared Emperor X to They Might Be Giants because of their shared penchant for catchy songs and nerdy subject matter.

== Track listing ==
Western Teleport track listing
No.	Title	Length
1.	"Erica Western Teleport"	3:33
2.	"Sig Alert"	2:54
3.	"Canada Day"	4:19
4.	"A Violent Translation of the Concordia Headscarp"	1:59
5.	"The Magnetic Media Storage Practices of Rural Pakistan"	1:43
6.	"Defiance (for Elise Sunderhuse)"	3:42
7.	"Anti-Rage"	1:47
8.	"Allahu Akbar"	3:31
9.	"Compressor Repair"	1:56
10.	"Sincerely, H. C. Pregerson"	3:11
11.	"Erica Western Geiger Counter"	2:56
Total length:		31:31
