= Nothing but Gingerbread Left =

Short story by Henry Kuttner

"Nothing but Gingerbread Left" is a science fiction short story by American writer Henry Kuttner. It was first published in the magazine Astounding Science Fiction in 1943. The story describes a marching song, developed by linguists, that is so "catchy" that it preoccupies the mind of anyone who hears it to such a degree that they are unable to think about anything else: an "earworm". Written during World War II, it describes the song's effects on German morale, climaxing with Adolf Hitler failing to deliver an important speech about the Eastern Front because he cannot stop thinking about the song.

The Encyclopedia of Science Fiction has noted it as an early example of memes in fiction.

== See also ==
- Military cadence
