= Long-term nuclear waste warning messages =

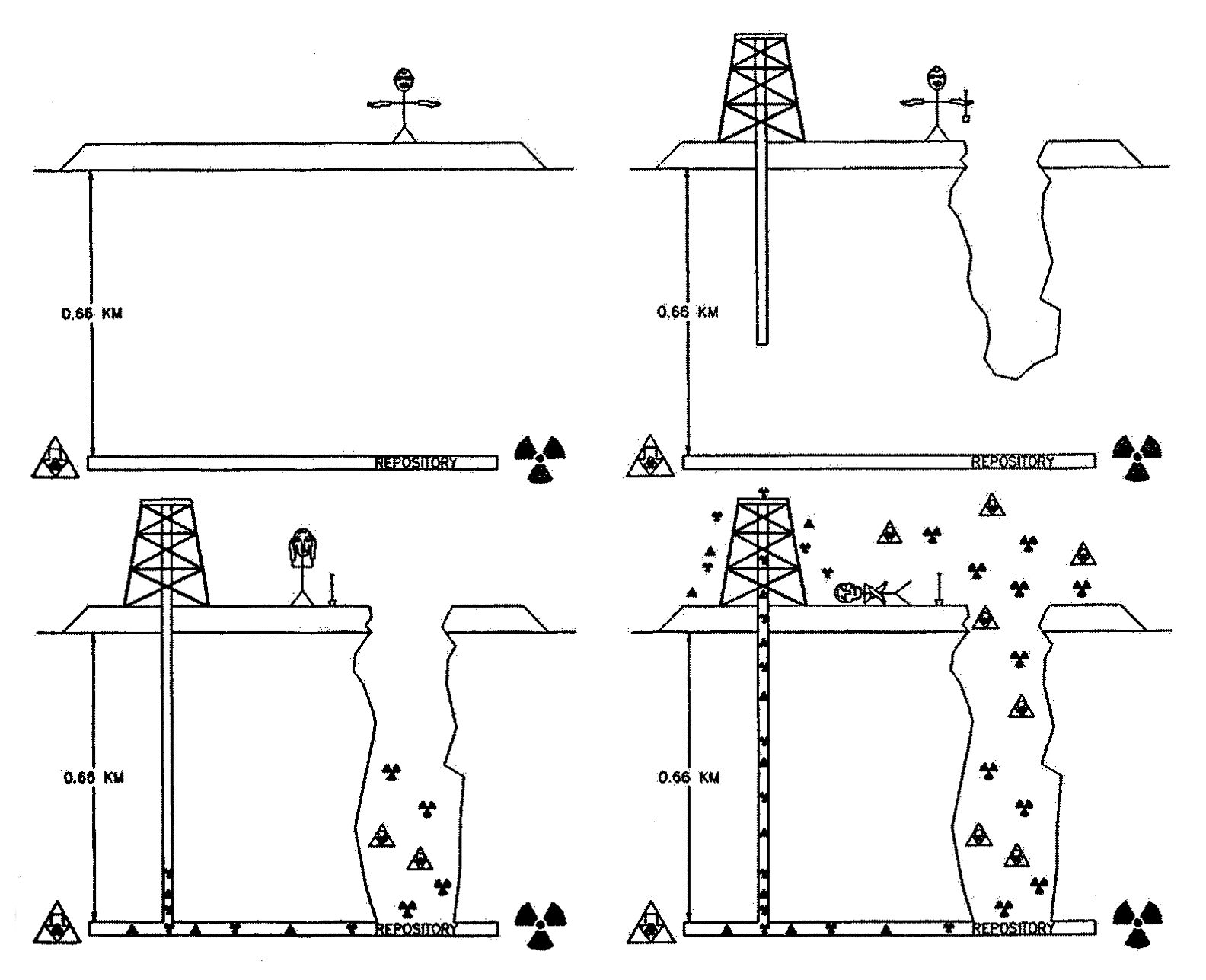
Proposed pictogram warning of the dangers of buried nuclear waste for the Waste Isolation Pilot Plant

Long-term nuclear waste warning messages are communication attempts intended to deter human intrusion at nuclear waste repositories in the far future, within or above the order of magnitude of 10,000 years. Nuclear semiotics is an interdisciplinary field of research that aims to study and design optimal signage techniques and messages for this purpose; it was first established by the American Human Interference Task Force in 1981.

A 1993 report from Sandia National Laboratories recommended that such messages be constructed at several levels of complexity. They suggested that the sites should include foreboding physical features which would immediately convey to future visitors that the site was both man-made and dangerous, as well as providing pictographic information attempting to convey some details of the danger, and written explanations for those able to read it.

== Message ==
A 1993 report from Sandia National Laboratories aimed to communicate a series of messages non-linguistically to any future visitors to a waste site. It gave the following wording as an example of what those messages should evoke:

This place is a message... and part of a system of messages... pay attention to it!
Sending this message was important to us. We considered ourselves to be a powerful culture.
This place is not a place of honor... no highly esteemed deed is commemorated here... nothing valued is here.
What is here was dangerous and repulsive to us. This message is a warning about danger.
The danger is in a particular location... it increases towards a center... the center of danger is here... of a particular size and shape, and below us.
The danger is still present, in your time, as it was in ours.
The danger is to the body, and it can kill.
The form of the danger is an emanation of energy.
The danger is unleashed only if you substantially disturb this place physically. This place is best shunned and left uninhabited.

The Sandia report further recommended that any such message should comprise four levels of increasing complexity:

1. Rudimentary information: "Something man-made is here"
2. Cautionary information: "Something man-made is here and it is dangerous"
3. Basic information: Tells what, why, when, where, who, and how
4. Complex information: Highly detailed written records, tables, figures, graphs, maps and diagrams

== Written messages ==
Proposed design for "small subsurface markers" to be buried randomly in great numbers across the Waste Isolation Pilot Plant

The Waste Isolation Pilot Plant has done extensive research in development of written or pictorial messages to warn future generations. Since today's written languages are unlikely to survive, the research team has considered pictograms and hostile architecture in addition to them. Texts were proposed to be translated to every UN written language. In 1994, Level II, III, and IV messages in English were translated into French, Spanish, Chinese, Arabic, Russian, and Navajo, with plans to continue testing and revision of the original English text and subsequent eventual translation into further languages.

Carl Sagan was invited to participate in the Waste Isolation Pilot Plant panel to discuss the topic of nuclear semiotics, but could not attend due to a scheduling conflict. However, he still sent in his opinion in the form of a letter which suggested the use of the skull & crossbones symbol to dissuade trespassing by future civilizations.

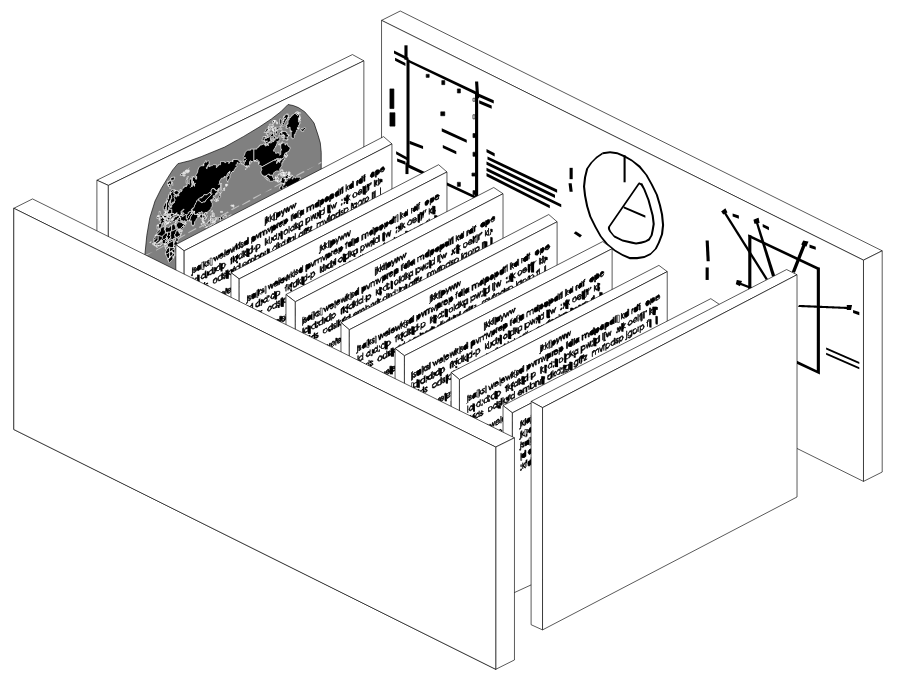
Design for an information center at the Waste Isolation Pilot Plant

Conceptual designs for the Waste Isolation Pilot Plant included an "Information Center" at the geometric center of the site. The building would be an open structure of solid granite or concrete, measuring 40 by 32 by 10 feet (12.2 m × 9.8 m × 3.0 m), and contain Level IV messages. The plans included a suggestion that the building be designed so as to create a "dissonant and mournful" whistling sound when wind blew through it, acting as a Level I message.

Working as part of the Human Interference Task Force in 1981, Vilmos Voigt from Eötvös–Loránd University (Budapest) proposed the installation of warning signs in the most important global languages in a concentric pattern around any terminal storage location. As time passed, further signs would be added translating the earlier signs, with the earlier ones remaining in place.

== Physical markers ==
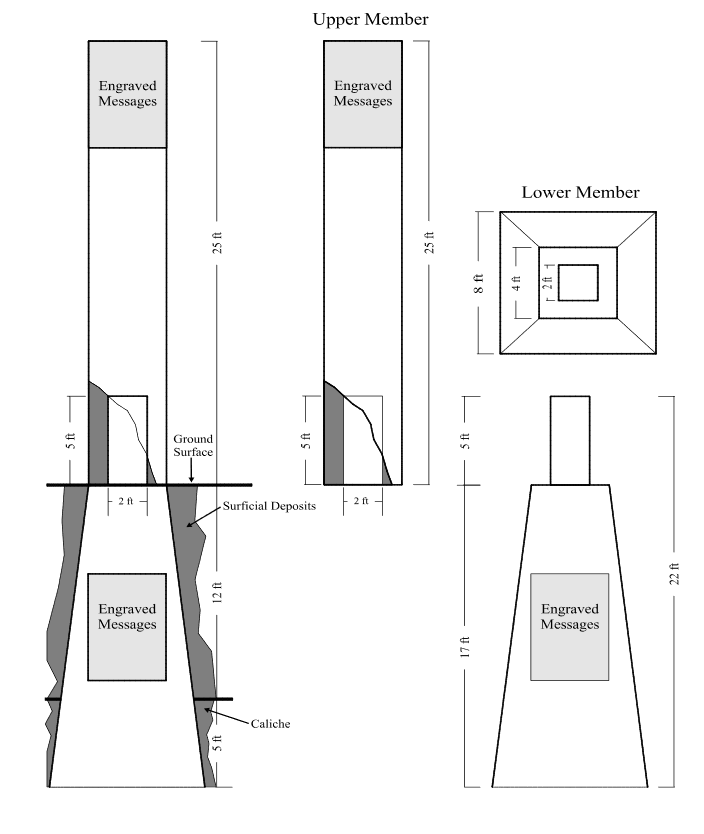
A conceptual design of Waste Isolation Pilot Plant's large surface marker.

The Sandia report explored designs for physical markers which conveyed the concepts of dangerous emanations, shapes that evoke bodily harm, and the concept of "shunned land" that appears destroyed or poisoned. The named designs suggested included:

Landscape of Thorns
A mass of many irregularly-sized spikes protruding from the ground in all directions.
Spike Field
A series of extremely large spikes emerging from the ground at different angles.
Spikes Bursting Through Grid
A large square grid pattern across the site, through which large spikes protrude at various angles.
Leaning Stone Spikes
70 feet (21 m) tall and 15 to 20 feet (4.6 to 6.1 m) across at the base, at a slope of 1:14.
Menacing Earthworks
Large mounds of earth shaped like lightning bolts, emanating from the edges of a square site. The shapes would be strikingly visible from the air, or from artificial hills constructed around the site.
Black Hole
An enormous slab of basalt or black-dyed concrete, rendering the land uninhabitable and unfarmable.
Rubble Landscape
A large square-shaped pile of dynamited rock, which over time would still appear anomalous and give a sense of something having been destroyed.
Forbidding Blocks
A network of hundreds of house-sized stone blocks, dyed black and arranged in an irregular square grid, suggesting a network of "streets" which feel ominous and lead nowhere. The blocks are intended to make a large area entirely unsuitable for farming or other future use.

== Cultural research ==
To determine how to convey long-term nuclear warning messages, the Zeitschrift für Semiotik (Tübingen, Germany) issued a poll in 1982 and 1983 asking how a message might be communicated for a duration of 10,000 years. The poll asked the following question: "How would it be possible to inform our descendants for the next 10,000 years about the storage locations and dangers of radioactive waste?" leading to the following answers:

=== Thomas Sebeok ===
The linguist Thomas Sebeok was a member of the Bechtel working group. Building on earlier suggestions made by Alvin Weinberg and Arsen Darnay he proposed the creation of an atomic priesthood, a panel of experts where members would be replaced through nominations by a council. Similar to the Catholic Church – which has preserved and authorized its message for almost 2,000 years – the atomic priesthood would have to preserve the knowledge about locations and dangers of radioactive waste by creating rituals and myths. The priesthood would indicate off-limits areas and the consequences of disobedience.

Tradeoffs with this approach include:

1. An atomic priesthood would gain political influence based on the contingencies that it would oversee.
2. This system of information favors the creation of hierarchies.
3. The message could be split into independent parts.
4. Information about waste sites would grant power to a privileged class. People from outside this group might attempt to seize this information by force.

Novelist and semiotician Umberto Eco commented on Sebeok's report in his 1993 book "The Search for the Perfect Language", where he analyzed whether a narrative system of communication with the future, or aliens, could be stronger than one based on written language or pictograms.

=== Stanisław Lem ===
Polish science-fiction author Stanisław Lem proposed the creation of artificial satellites that would transmit information from their orbit to Earth for millennia. He also described a biological coding of DNA in a mathematical sense, which would reproduce itself automatically. Information Plants would only grow near a terminal storage site and would inform humans about the dangers. The DNA of the so-called atomic flowers would contain the necessary data about both the location and its contents.

Lem acknowledged the problem with his idea was that humans would be unlikely to know the meaning of atomic flowers 10,000 years later, and thus unlikely to decode their DNA in a search for information.

=== Françoise Bastide and Paolo Fabbri ===
French author Françoise Bastide and the Italian semiotician Paolo Fabbri proposed the breeding of so-called "radiation cats" or "ray cats". Cats have a long history of cohabitation with humans, and this approach assumes that their domestication will continue indefinitely. These radiation cats would change significantly in color when they came near radioactive emissions and serve as living indicators of danger.

To transport the message, the importance of the cats would need to be set in the collective awareness through fairy tales and myths. Those fairy tales and myths in turn could be transmitted through poetry, music and painting. As a response, the podcast 99% Invisible commissioned musician Emperor X to write a song about ray cats for a 2014 episode about long-term nuclear waste warning messages. The song, called "10,000-Year Earworm to Discourage Settlement Near Nuclear Waste Repositories (Don't Change Color, Kitty)", was designed to be "so catchy and annoying that it might be handed down from generation to generation over a span of 10,000 years".

=== Vilmos Voigt ===
Vilmos Voigt from Eötvös-Loránd University (Budapest) proposed the installation of warning signs in the most important global languages in a concentric pattern around the terminal storage location. After a certain time span new signs with translations would be installed, but the old signs would not be removed. Newer signs would be posted farther away from the location, thus the warning would be understandable as languages change and it would be possible to understand the older languages through the translation.

=== Emil Kowalski ===
Physicist Emil Kowalski from Baden, Switzerland, proposed that terminal storage locations be constructed in such a way that future generations could reach them only with a high technical ability. The probability of an unwanted breach would then become extremely small. Kowalski expected that cultures able to perform such excavations and drilling would be able to detect radioactive material and be aware of its dangers.

== See also ==
- Deep time – Time scales on the billions of years
- Defensive design – Design practice that plans for contingencies
- Georgia Guidestones – Former granite monument in Georgia, US
- Hostile architecture – Civic design intended to exclude certain populations
- Into Eternity
- Knowledge ark – Collection of knowledge in case of civilisational collapse
- Long Now – American nonprofit organization
- Longtermism – Philosophical view which prioritises the long-term future
- Time capsule – Historic objects of goods or information
