= Paolo Fabbri (semiotician) =

Italian semiotician (1939–2020)

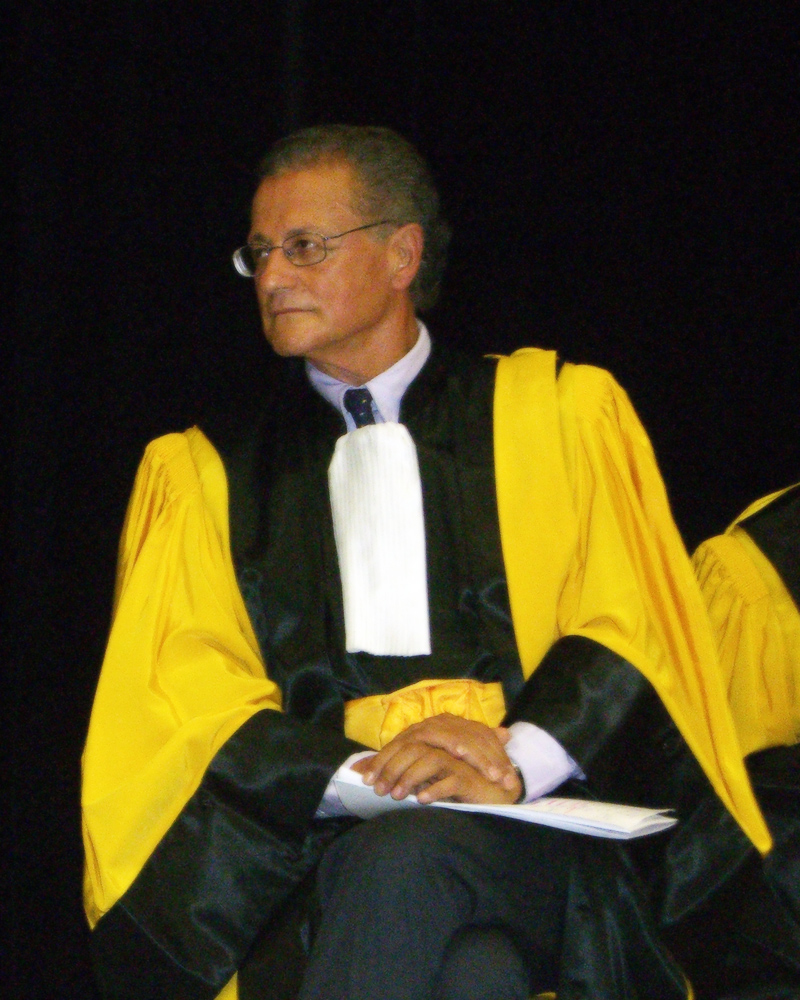
- Fabbri in 2013
- Born: 17 April 1939; Rimini, Emilia-Romagna, Kingdom of Italy
- Died: 2 June 2020 (aged 81); Rimini, Emilia-Romagna, Italy

Academic background
- Education: University of Florence; École Pratique des Hautes Études

Academic work
- Discipline: Semiotics
- Institutions: University of Urbino (1967–76); University of Bologna (1977–2003); University of Palermo (1986–90); Università Iuav di Venezia (2003–09)
- Notable ideas: Ray cat

Paolo Fabbri (17 April 1939 – 2 June 2020) was an Italian semiotician.

== Early life and education ==
Fabbri was born in Rimini in 1939.

Fabbri graduated from Rimini's classical lyceum in 1957. He studied at the University of Florence, graduating in 1962, and at the École Pratique des Hautes Études in Paris, where he was taught by Roland Barthes, Lucien Goldmann, and Algirdas Julien Greimas.

== Academic career ==
Returning to Italy in 1966, Fabbri taught at the University of Florence's Faculty of Architecture alongside Umberto Eco; Fabbri inspired the character of "Paolo da Rimini" in Eco's debut novel, The Name of the Rose (1980).

In 1967, Fabbri moved to the University of Urbino as Professor of Philosophy of Language. In 1970, he cofounded the university's International Centre of Semiotics and Linguistics (CiSS) with Carlo Bo and Giuseppe Paioni, one of the earliest schools of semiotics. He was the principal collaborator of Greimas, his former teacher, and collaborated with Erving Goffman in the mid-1970s.

Fabbri moved to the University of Bologna in 1977, teaching the Semiotics of Arts course in the degree for Arts, Music and Entertainment, over which he presided from 1997 to 2001. From 1990 until 2003, he was part of the Department of Visual Arts of the Faculty of Literature and Philosophy.

Between 1984 and 1991, he collaborated in semiotician research conferences hosted at the School for Advanced Studies in the Social Sciences.

Fabbri taught at the University of Palermo's Faculty of Education between 1986 and 1990. Between 2003 and 2009, he was Professor of Semiotics of Art and Artistic Literature at the IUAV University of Venice's Faculty of Design and Arts.

In 2013, Fabbri became director of CiSS. In 2017, Fabbri was made honorary professor at the universities of Santiago and Lima.

Fabbri is remembered more as an educator than his writings. He developed a reputation for not publishing his research in the semiotic field, leading to his nickname of abbas agraphicus (the abbot who does not write), to which Fabbri replied that "the professor is oral", transmitting more knowledge through meeting than texts. Fabbri eschewed "-ism" labels.

== Cultural activities ==
During his life, Fabbri sat of the committee of several cultural institutions, including the Fellini Museum in Rimini, and the 400th anniversary of the Biblioteca Civica Gambalunga, to which he donated fifty philosophical works and manuscripts in April 2019.

Fabbri's appointments to other cultural entities included as:

- Director of the Italian Cultural Institute in Paris (1992–96)
- Director of Cattolica's Mystfest, a festival of international crime and mystery (1996–97)
- Scientific advisor to the Prix Italia (1999–2001)
- President of Florence's Festival dei Popoli (2000–04)
- President of the Institut de la Pensée Contemporaine of Paris Diderot University (2004–06)
- Director of Rimini's Federico Fellini Foundation (2011–13)

== Personal life and death ==
In December 2019, Fabbri was awarded the Sigismondo d'Oro, the highest civic award offered by Rimini's municipal government, alongside Marco Missiroli.

Fabbri owned a villa on the Covignano hill outside Rimini. His brother, Gianni, was the owner of Rimini's Paradiso nightclub.

Fabbri died on 2 June 2020. Among those releasing public condolences were Andrea Gnassi, Rimini's municipal mayor, Stefano Bonaccini, President of the Emilia-Romagna Region, and regional councillor Emma Pettiti.

== Publications ==
- Pertinence et adéquation (1992) – a critical response to Greimas
- Tactica de los signos. Ensayos de Semiotica (Gedisa Editorial: Barcelona, 1996)
- La svolta semiotica (Laterza, 1998)
- Elogio de Babel (2000)
- Au nom du sens: autour de l'œuvre d'Umberto Eco (2000) – a selection of conference papers on Eco edited by Fabbri and Jean Petitot
- Segni del tempo (2003) – essays on how the interactions of meaning with words are not reducible to precise definitions
- Gianfranco Baruchello. Flussi, pieghe, pensieri in bocca (2007)
- La competenza semiotica (Carocci: Rome, 2012), with Dario Mangano
- Elogio del conflitto (Sequitur: Madrid, 2017)
- LÉfficacia semiotica (Mimesis: Milan, 2017)
- Maurizio Cattelan: Victory is not an Option (2019)
- Under the Sign of Federico Fellini (2019)
- Vedere ed arte. Iconico e icastico (Mimesis, 2020)

== See also ==
- Ray cat – a cat for detecting nuclear radiation that was proposed by Fabbri, among others
