= International Association for the Semiotics of Law =

International Roundtables for the Semiotics of Law (IRSL) is a philosophical society founded in 1987 whose purpose is to promote semiotic analysis of the law. The International Journal for the Semiotics of Law (Springer) is the leading international journal of legal semiotics.
