= List of people from Tucson, Arizona =

This is a listing of notable people who were born in, or have lived in, Tucson, Arizona. For people whose only connection with the city is attending the University of Arizona, see: List of University of Arizona people. Coaches of University of Arizona athletic teams should not be included either.

== Athletics ==
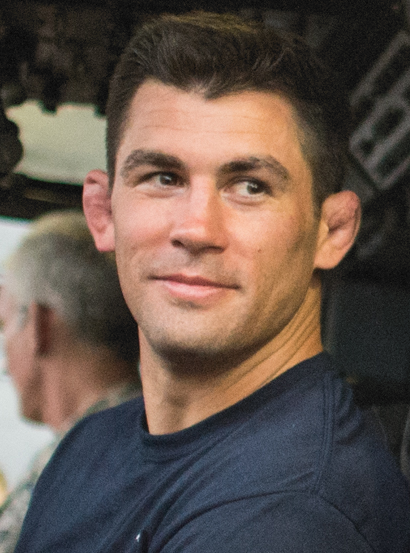
UFC Fighter Dominick Cruz was born in San Diego but grew up in Tucson and attended high school in the city

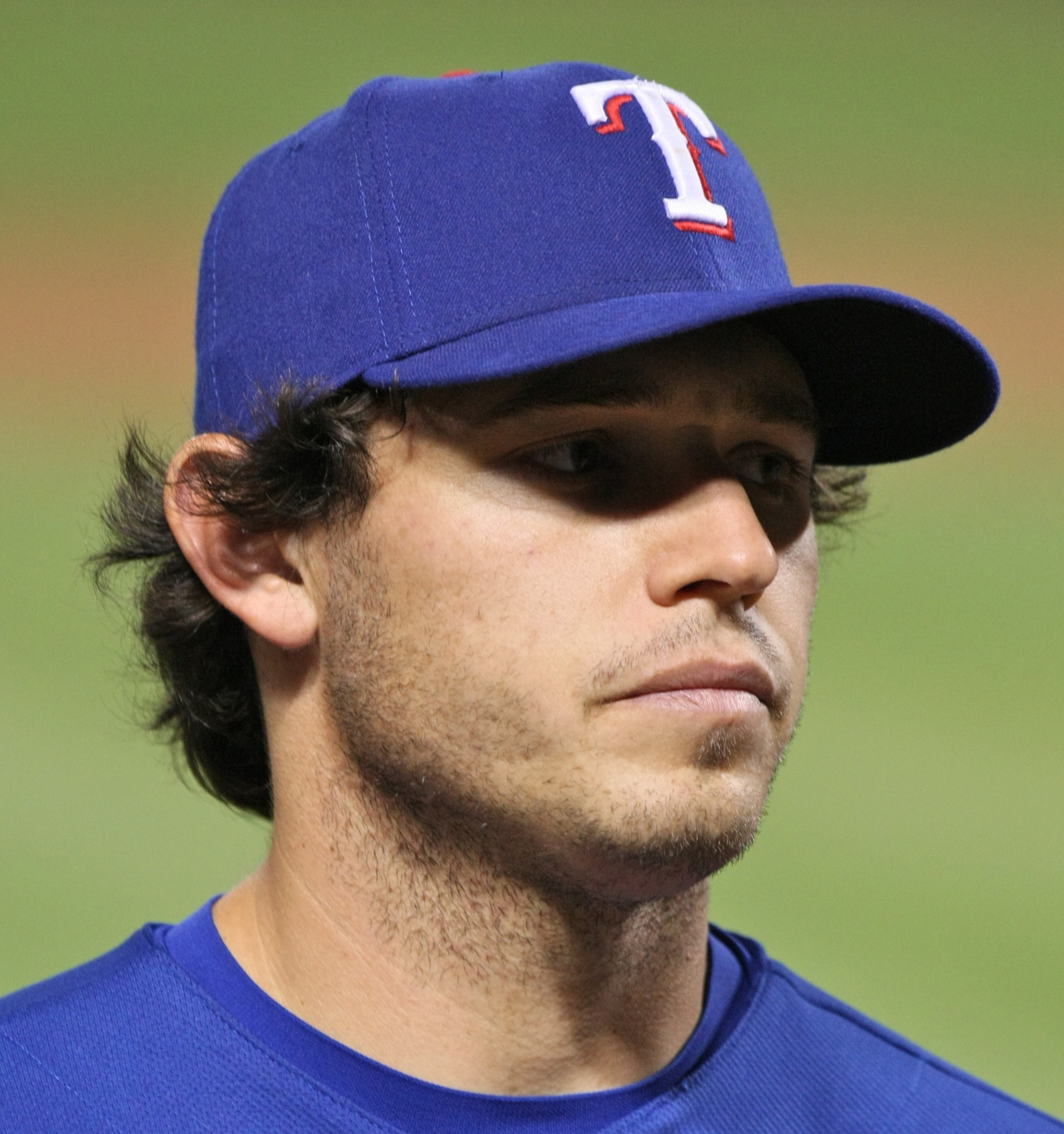
MLB player Ian Kinsler was born and raised in Tucson

- George Arias – baseball player
- Dave Baldwin – major league baseball player, writer, artist
- Michael Bates – National Football League (NFL) player, sprinter, and 1992 Olympian
- Stanley Berryhill – NFL player
- Chad Beyer – cyclist
- Craig Bjornson – baseball player and coach
- Nat Borchers – soccer player
- Alex Bowman – NASCAR driver
- Henry Brauner – soccer player
- Bryce Cotton – basketball player
- Dominick Cruz – mixed martial artist
- Lum Davenport – baseball player
- Ike Davis – baseball player
- Chris Duncan – baseball player
- Shelley Duncan – baseball player
- Sean Elliott – basketball player
- Cole Ford – football player
- Jim Grabb – tennis player
- J. J. Hardy – baseball player
- Ron Hassey – baseball player
- Gary Hayes – football player
- Alex Kellner – born in Tucson, baseball player
- Walt Kellner – born in Tucson, baseball player
- Mike Kellogg – football player
- Ian Kinsler – baseball player
- Chris Knierim – pairs figure skater
- Hank Leiber – baseball player
- Eddie Leon – born in Tucson, baseball player
- Lafayette Lever – basketball player
- Caitlin Leverenz – Olympic swimmer, born in Tucson, attended Sahuaro High School
- Pete McCaffrey – basketball player
- Roger McCluskey – National Sprint Car Hall of Fame racer
- Alice Greenough Orr – rodeo star, originally from Montana
- Tom Pagnozzi – baseball player
- Allen Pitts – Canadian Football League player
- Bijan Robinson – NFL running back for the Atlanta Falcons
- Sam Sacksen – 2008 Beijing Olympic modern pentathlete
- Anthony Shumaker – baseball player
- Tommy Silva – soccer player
- Michael Smith – NFL running back
- Brad Steinke – Emmy award-winning sportscaster
- Kerri Strug – Olympic gold-medalist gymnast
- Donny Toia – soccer player
- Alex Verdugo – baseball player
- Roman Bravo Young – freestyle and folkstyle wrestler, two-time NCAA champion for Penn State University
- Win Young – Olympic medalist in diving

== Business ==
- Leopoldo Carrillo – Mexican-American entrepreneur, early founder of Tucson
- Arturo Moreno – entrepreneur, owner of Los Angeles Angels of Anaheim
- Jeff Rein – chairman and chief executive officer of Walgreens
- Robert Sarver – entrepreneur, principal owner of Phoenix Suns
- Robert Stewart – co-founder of GMA Network

== Law and order ==
- Eugene O'Dunne – jurist on the Supreme Bench of Baltimore
- Clay Pell – lawyer

== Literature ==
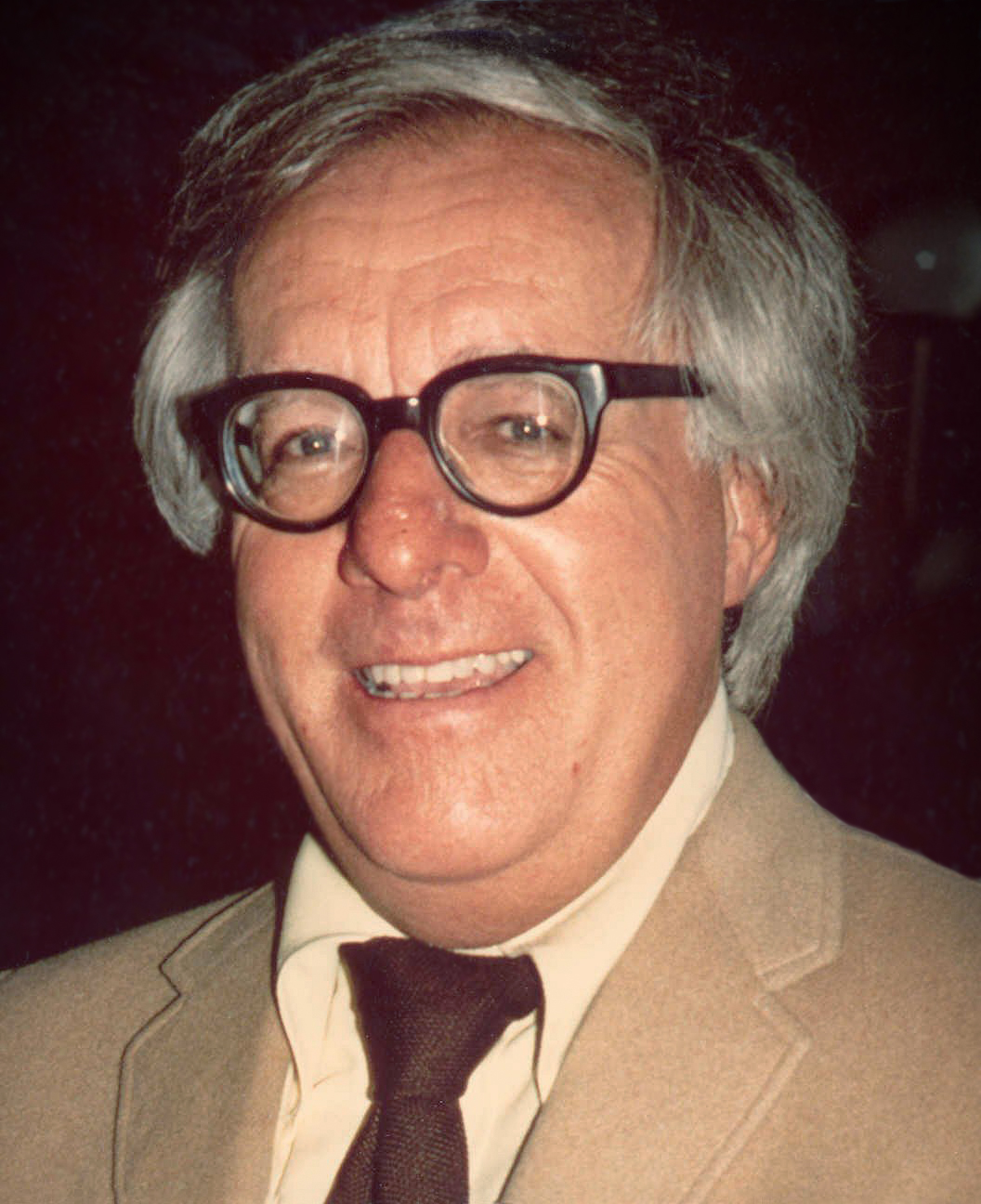
Ray Bradbury

- Edward Abbey – author
- Sue Alexander – children's author
- Jon Anderson – poet
- Byrd Baylor – essayist and children's author
- Michael Blake – author
- Charles Bowden – author
- Ray Bradbury – author
- Erskine Caldwell – playwright
- Max Cannon – author and creator of the comic strip Red Meat
- Mitch Cullin – author
- Charles G. Finney – author
- Frances Gillmor – folklorist, scholar and novelist
- Andrew Greeley – author, scholar and Roman Catholic priest
- Brenda Hillman – poet, translator
- Barbara Kingsolver – novelist
- Joseph Wood Krutch – author
- Todd Miller – journalist
- Tom Miller – travel writer
- Gary Paul Nabhan — author and ethnobotanist
- Adam Rex – children's writer and illustrator
- Stacey Richter – author
- Richard Shelton – poet, author
- Richard Siken – poet, painter, filmmaker
- Leslie Marmon Silko – author
- Susan Sontag – author, critic and public intellectual
- Luci Tapahonso – poet laureate of the Navajo Nation
- Ron Terpening – author and professor emeritus of Italian at the University of Arizona
- David Foster Wallace – author
- Peter Wild – poet, author and professor of English at the University of Arizona
- Ofelia Zepeda – poet laureate of Tucson, author
- Tom Zoellner – nonfiction author

== Movies, television, and media ==
- Rex Allen – actor, musician
- Max Amini – stand-up comedian
- Hailey Baldwin – model
- Mika Boorem – actress
- Lynn Borden – actress and 1957 Miss Arizona
- Roy Brown – actor
- Brooke Burke – model, TV host
- Aaron Chang – photographer
- Kaylee DeFer – actress
- Barbara Eden – actress
- Pablo Francisco – stand-up comedian
- Savannah Guthrie – television personality
- Dan Hicks – sportscaster
- Michael Horse – actor, jeweler, painter
- Pat Hughes – baseball announcer
- Dominic Janes – actor
- Cord Jefferson – screenwriter, director, journalist
- Ben Patrick Johnson – journalist, model, voice-over artist
- Brad Johnson – actor, former Marlboro Man
- Daniel Kennedy – actor
- Gavin MacIntosh – child/teen actor, model
- Taryn Manning – actress
- Clare McNulty – actress
- George Meyer – Simpsons producer and writer
- Bentley Mitchum – actor
- Burt Mustin – actor
- Inde Navarrette - actress
- Noel Neill – actress
- Sierra Teller Ornelas – filmmaker and screenwriter
- Larry Pine – actor
- Timothy Reckart – Oscar-nominated filmmaker
- Garry Shandling – comedian and actor
- Tommy Shannon – musician, Stevie Ray Vaughan and Double Trouble
- W. Eugene Smith – photographer
- Frederick Sommer – photographer
- Martin Spanjers – actor
- Sally Todd – model, actress
- Amber Valletta – actress
- Janet Varney – actress
- Kate Walsh – actress
- Lou Waters – newscaster
- Nick Young – actor
- Parker Young – model, actor

== Music, arts ==
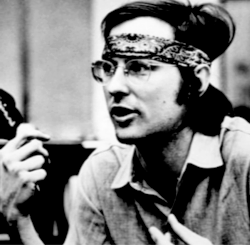
Joseph Byrd

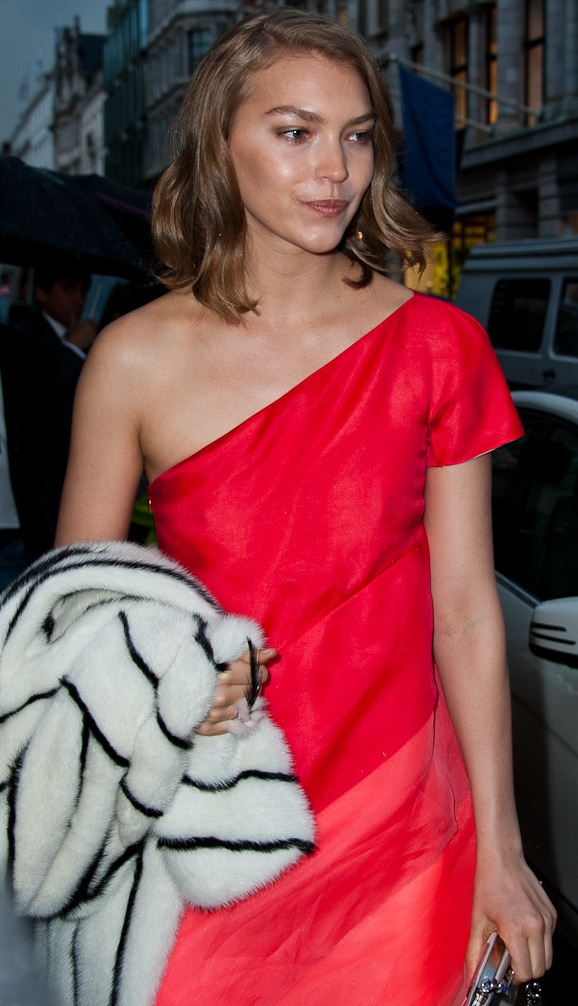
Arizona Muse

- Panteha Abareshi – multidisciplinary visual artist
- Madeline Heineman Berger – music and arts promoter
- Duane Bryers – painter, illustrator and sculptor
- Joey Burns – musician
- Joseph Byrd – musician
- Luis Coronel – singer, musician
- Jason DeCorse – musician, member of Greyhound Soul
- John Convertino – musician
- James Pringle Cook – Western landscape painter
- Ted DeGrazia – artist
- John Denver – singer, musician
- Daniel Martin Diaz – artist and musician
- Maynard Dixon – artist
- Duane Eddy – musician, member of the Rock and Roll Hall of Fame
- Howe Gelb – musician
- Greg Ginn – musician, founder of Black Flag and SST Records
- Lalo Guerrero – "father of Chicano music"
- Cord Jefferson – writer and film director
- Ulysses Kay – composer
- Katie Lee – folk singer, writer, photographer
- Dan Levenson – old-time musician
- Bob Log III – musician
- Linda McCartney – photographer, musician
- Arizona Muse – model
- Dennis F. Parker – musician, recording engineer
- Raymond Pettibon – artist
- Signe Pierce – multidisciplinary artist
- Rainer Ptacek – composer, musician
- Linda Ronstadt – singer, member of the Rock and Roll Hall of Fame
- Ivan and Jane Rosenquist – art gallerists
- Barry Sadler – singer-songwriter
- Pat The Bunny Schneeweis – folk-punk artist
- Sara Tea – musician and DJ
- Randy "R Dub!" Williams – DJ and radio host
- Mark Wystrach – musician

== Politics ==
- Andy Biggs – U.S. representative for Arizona
- J. W. Buchanan – Arizona state senator, member of the Arizona House of Representatives
- Dean Burch – Republican National Committee chairman, 1964–1965; chairman, FCC
- James B. Burkholder – peace activist and retired U.S. Army officer
- Richard Carmona – U.S. Surgeon General
- Tony Carrillo – Arizona state legislator
- Juan Ciscomani – U.S. representative for Arizona
- James N. Corbett – former mayor of Tucson
- Eli Crane – U.S. representative for Arizona
- Terri Cruz – community organizer and political activist
- Dennis DeConcini – U.S. senator
- Randy Fine – U.S. representative for Florida
- Gabby Giffords – U.S. representative for Arizona
- Adelita Grijalva – U.S. representative for Arizona; daughter of Raul Grijalva
- Raul Grijalva – U.S. representative for Arizona; father of Adelita Grijalva
- Alma Hernandez – member of the Arizona House of Representatives
- Don Hummel – politician, former Tucson mayor, businessman
- Mark Kelly – U.S. senator, former astronaut
- Laura Loomer – far-right political activist and white nationalist
- Kyrsten Sinema – U.S. senator for Arizona
- Robert C. Strong – U.S. diplomat
- Mark Udall – U.S. senator from Colorado, former member of the House
- Mo Udall – U.S. representative for Arizona
- Stewart Udall – U.S. Secretary of Interior and U.S. representative
- Tom Udall – U.S. senator from New Mexico

== Science and medicine ==
- David Arnett – astronomer
- Bart Bok – astronomer
- Frank Borman – astronaut, orbited the Moon on Apollo 8
- A. E. Douglass – astronomer, dendrochronologist
- Lucy May Cranwell FRSNZ – New Zealand botanist
- Tom Gehrels – planetary scientist
- Emil Haury – archaeologist
- Rashad Khalifa – biochemist and founder of United Submitters International
- Gerard Kuiper – planetary scientist
- Brian A. Larkins – molecular biologist
- William Rathje – archaeologist, Garbage Project director
- Peter M. Rhee – physician
- Elizabeth Roemer – astronomer
- Rachna Shroff – oncologist
- Peter Smith – scientist, principal investigator of Phoenix Project
- Andrew Weil – doctor who promotes integrative medicine
- Wieslaw Z. Wisniewski – astronomer

== Military ==
- Thad Allen – U.S. Coast Guard admiral
- Frank L. Culin Jr. – United States Army major general
- José de Urrea – Mexican general

== Crime ==
- Robert John Bardo – convicted murderer and stalker of actress and model, Rebecca Schaeffer
- Joseph Bonanno – mobster
- Jared Lee Loughner – convicted mass murderer who perpetrated the 2011 Tucson shooting
- Stephen Paddock – mass shooter who perpetrated the 2017 Las Vegas shooting
- Charles Schmid – killer

== Religion ==
- William M. Branham – minister
- Eusebio Kino – pioneer missionary and explorer

== Miscellaneous ==
- John Dossey – mathematician
- Margaret Sanger – birth control activist; feminist; founder of Planned Parenthood
- María Urquides – educator, "mother of bilingual education"
