= Sanctuary movement =

Effort by U.S. churches to shelter Central American refugees during the 1980s

The Sanctuary movement was a religious and political campaign in the United States that began in the early 1980s to provide safe haven for Central American refugees fleeing civil conflict. The movement was a response to federal immigration policies that made obtaining asylum difficult for Central Americans.

At its peak, Sanctuary involved over 500 congregations in the United States, which, by declaring themselves official "sanctuaries," committed to providing shelter, protection, material goods and often legal advice to Central American refugees. Various denominations were involved, including Lutherans, United Church of Christ, Roman Catholics, Eastern Orthodox, Presbyterians, Methodists, Baptists, Jews, Unitarian Universalists, Quakers, and Mennonites.

Movement members acted both in defiance of federal laws (civil disobedience) and as citizens upholding laws they thought their government was violating (civil initiative). Several prominent Sanctuary figures were arrested and put on trial in the mid-1980s, including its two "founders", John Fife and James A. Corbett. The movement's historical roots derive from the right of sanctuary in medieval law and Jewish and Christian social teachings. Its contemporary roots derive from the American Civil War and its Underground Railroad as well as the sanctuaries offered to conscientious objectors during the Vietnam War.

== History ==
=== Central American Conflict ===
Between 1980 and 1991, nearly a million Central Americans crossed the U.S. border seeking asylum. Most were fleeing political repression and violence caused by civil wars in Guatemala and El Salvador; others had fled Nicaragua in the wake of the 1979 Nicaraguan Revolution. In El Salvador, the military had killed over 10,000 people by 1980, including Archbishop Óscar Romero and four U.S. churchwomen. In Guatemala, government-backed paramilitary groups killed 50,000, disappeared 100,000 and perpetrated 626 village massacres.

Policy under the Reagan administration greatly hindered Central Americans from obtaining asylum status. Congress forbade foreign aid to countries committing human rights abuses, and at same time the U.S. provided funds, training and arms to the Salvadoran and Guatemalan governments. Because admitting these governments' abuses would bar the U.S. from providing further aid, the Reagan administration instead argued that Central Americans were "economic migrants" fleeing poverty, not governmental repression. Consequently, Central Americans stood little chance in the U.S. immigration system, where asylum is granted based on proof of "well-founded fear" of persecution. Just before Reagan took office, Congress had passed the Refugee Act of 1980, which incorporated this international definition of political asylum into U.S. law, which formerly granted refugee status only to those "fleeing Communism." But the Reagan administration retained discretion under the law and prevented the legal recognition of Central American claims. Visa approval rates for Guatemalans and Salvadorans hovered somewhere under 3% in 1984, as compared to a 60% approval rate for Iranians, 40% for Afghans fleeing Soviet invasion, 32% for Poles, 12% for Nicaraguans escaping the Sandinistas and 100% for Cubans. In 1983, one Guatemalan was granted asylum in the U.S.

U.S. economic policies, such as trade agreements and corporate interests, also played a significant role in the exploitation of Central American resources and labor forces, actions that exacerbated socioeconomic inequalities and worked to drive people to seek better opportunities elsewhere. The combination of political repression, economic exploitation, and social upheaval created conditions ripe for mass migration, as individuals and families sought safety, economic security, and a chance for a better life in the U.S. Thus, economic imperialism catalyzed the migration crisis in the 1980s, shaping the lives of millions of Central Americans and their descendants.

Overall, the combination of economic exploitation, military support for repressive regimes, and restrictive immigration policies under the Reagan administration created a hostile environment for Central American migrants, forcing many to endure further hardship and uncertainty in their quest for safety and refuge. Many Central Americans who reached the U.S. were placed in detention centers and sent home. Many protested, saying they would face severe dangers upon their return. An American Civil Liberties Union study in 1985 reported that 130 deported Salvadorans were found disappeared, tortured, or killed.

=== Public sanctuary ===
The sanctuary movement emerged in the 1980s as a response to political turmoil in Central America, offering refuge and support to those fleeing persecution. This grassroots effort reshaped societal perspectives on immigration, highlighting the failures of existing policies and emphasizing the moral imperative to protect vulnerable populations. As the movement gained momentum, it sparked discussions about broader concepts of sanctuary, leading to the development of naturalization covenants.

These covenants, born out of collaborative efforts between local governments, civil society organizations, and communities, formalize commitments to support and integrate immigrants. They signify a tangible manifestation of solidarity and a rejection of exclusionary rhetoric, fostering inclusive environments where immigrants can thrive. Naturalization covenants not only uphold the rights and dignity of immigrants but also serve as practical tools for promoting social cohesion and economic prosperity by recognizing immigrants' contributions to society.

In essence, the sanctuary movement's legacy endures through the establishment of naturalization covenants, reflecting an ongoing commitment to building inclusive and welcoming communities for all. The sanctuary movement formed in reaction to these policies.

It originated along the border with Mexico. The first church to declare itself a sanctuary for Central American refugees was Southside Presbyterian Church in Tucson, Arizona. The movement was sparked by the increased appearance of Central Americans at the U.S.-Mexico border. In 1980, Fife, Corbett, Jim Dudley, and other Tucson residents began providing legal, financial and material aid to Central American refugees.

Sanctuary drew on many aspects of Christian theology, but was centered on compassionate concern for those fleeing violent civil wars raging in Guatemala and El Salvador, but who met with routine deportation in the United States. Corbett has said that the tradition of his Quaker faith, and its involvement in the Civil War-era Underground Railroad that assisted fugitive slaves, was in part what compelled him to take action. For others, such as Gary Cook, associate pastor of the Central Presbyterian Church in Massillon, Ohio, merely interacting with desperate families compelled conscientious response: "We're a very conservative group of folks politically. But once we encountered the refugees face to face, we couldn't justify not taking them in." Similarly, Quaker Jim Dudley recalled coming across a man hitchhiking on the side of a road on the outskirts of Tucson. After picking him up, Dudley learned he was a Salvadoran attempting to get to San Francisco. Border Patrol agents stopped the car, identified the man as an illegal alien, and arrested him. The man's distress and the likelihood that he would be summarily deported left Dudley uneasy and prompted him to investigate further.

On March 24, 1982, the second anniversary of Archbishop Óscar Romero's assassination, John Fife, minister of the Southside Presbyterian Church in Tucson, gained the support of his congregation to declare his church a public sanctuary. Outside its building he posted two banners that read: "This is a Sanctuary for the Oppressed of Central America," and "Immigration: do not profane the Sanctuary of God." Several other churches, synagogues and student groups across the country followed suit, and by 1985 Sanctuary became a national movement with roughly 500 member sites.

Movement members likened Sanctuary to the Underground Railroad of the 19th century: Central Americans fled their countries, often under extremely dangerous circumstances, traveled through Mexico and eventually found safe haven in a sanctuary community in the United States or Canada. For example, refugees coming through Tucson came to Nogales, the nearest border town in Mexico, often on foot, and found refuge at El Sanctuario de Nuestra Señora de Guadalupe (Sanctuary of Our Lady of Guadalupe) Catholic Church. With help from Padre Ramón Dagoberto Quiñones, the head priest at Guadalupe, they traveled a short distance across the border to the Sacred Heart Catholic Church, whose steeple was visible from Mexico. There they found shelter, food, legal advice and perhaps a little money. The two churches kept in constant contact, and priests and laypeople traveled frequently between parishes.

Over the years of the movement, which was active until 1996, activists developed a number of coordinated routes for transporting people to designated Public Sanctuaries. At first, part of the effort was to get those with credible claims to Canada, whose landed immigrant status became available once a refugee turned him/herself in on Canadian soil. But the U.S. government convinced the new conservative government to tighten the border and exclude more Central American refugees. This led to many more U.S. churches becoming welcoming sanctuaries. Prospective candidates or families were matched by numerous factors with a community that was prepared to house them and assist them to make political statements by recounting their personal history. Those who were not willing to do public speaking, for example, would be matched with a community that was not interested in doing that level of organizing or was in a rural area where little public effort was possible. Volunteers drove refugees to exchange points where they were transported to their next night's lodging until they reached their destination. The system was highly decentralized; despite the pre-organization, it was fairly ad hoc, and different groups found varying methods for providing publicity or secrecy as protection.

Once the refugees found safe haven in a Sanctuary, U.S. congregations, student groups and activists often invited Central Americans to share their beliefs and experiences with the community. Refugees were invited to the pulpit to give testimony during services, congregations held special Central American peace nights where stories were shared and information given, and Central Americans and North Americans talked frequently and openly at Bible studies, meetings and rallies. As one congregant of Tucson's Southside Presbyterian Church remembers:

On any given night there might be from two to 25 [refugees] sleeping in the church. The congregation set up a one-room apartment for them behind the chapel. When that was full, they slept on foam pads in the Sunday school wing.

The denominational makeup of the movement was diverse, including Presbyterian, Quaker, Unitarian, Catholic, and Jewish congregations. About 10% of the sanctuaries were on university campuses and 1% at seminaries. The following are some official statements issued by major denominations within the U.S.:

The Presbyterian Church:

The Presbyterian Church recommends that 'That the General Assembly support congregations and individuals who provide sanctuary to asylum seekers as a way of showing Christian compassion for them and stressing the need for change in our government's policies and actions; and that other congregations be challenged seriously to take this stance.' 1983.

The American Lutheran Church:

Resolved, that The American Lutheran Church at its 1984 General Convention ... offer support and encouragement to congregations that have chosen to become refugee sanctuaries. 1984.

The American Baptist Churches in the U.S.A.:

Therefore, we commend to American Baptist churches the following: ... that we respect those churches that, responding to the leading of God's Spirit, are providing sanctuary for refugees fleeing certain suffering and death in central America. 1984.

The Rabbinical Assembly:

The Rabbinical Assembly endorses the concept of Sanctuary as provided by synagogues, churches and other communities of faith in the United States. 1984.

Secular groups also embraced the Sanctuary movement, such as Amnesty International, Americas Watch (which later became Human Rights Watch), legal aid groups, liberal members of Congress and student organizations (the University of California was particularly active). Op-eds appeared frequently in major national periodicals such as The New York Times, The Washington Post and Time Magazine. The entire city of Berkeley, California, declared itself a sanctuary. Writer Barbara Kingsolver popularized the movement in her 1998 novel The Bean Trees, in which she gives a fictional account of a sanctuary member housing refugees in her Tucson home.

This movement was succeeded in the 2000s by the movement of churches and other houses of worship to shelter immigrants in danger of deportation. The New Sanctuary Movement is a network of houses of worship that facilitates this effort.

From the late 1980s to the 2000s, there also have been instances of churches providing "sanctuary" for short periods to migrants facing deportation from Germany, France, Belgium, the Netherlands, Norway, Switzerland, Australia, the United States, and Canada, among other nations. From 1983 to 2003, Canada experienced 36 sanctuary incidents.

The New Sanctuary Movement organization estimates that at least 600,000 people in the United States have at least one family member in danger of deportation.

The movement was declared a 1984 winner of the Letelier-Moffitt Human Rights Award.

=== Border Witness Program ===
Jewish activist Laurie Melrood started the Rio Grande Border Witness Program within the Sanctuary movement as a form of consciousness raising for Americans. Participants would visit the Rio Grande Valley, meet with refugees, and return to their communities to organize solidarity efforts. The program is now organized by women's group ARISE who offer tours across the border for visiting religious groups.

=== Historical parallels ===
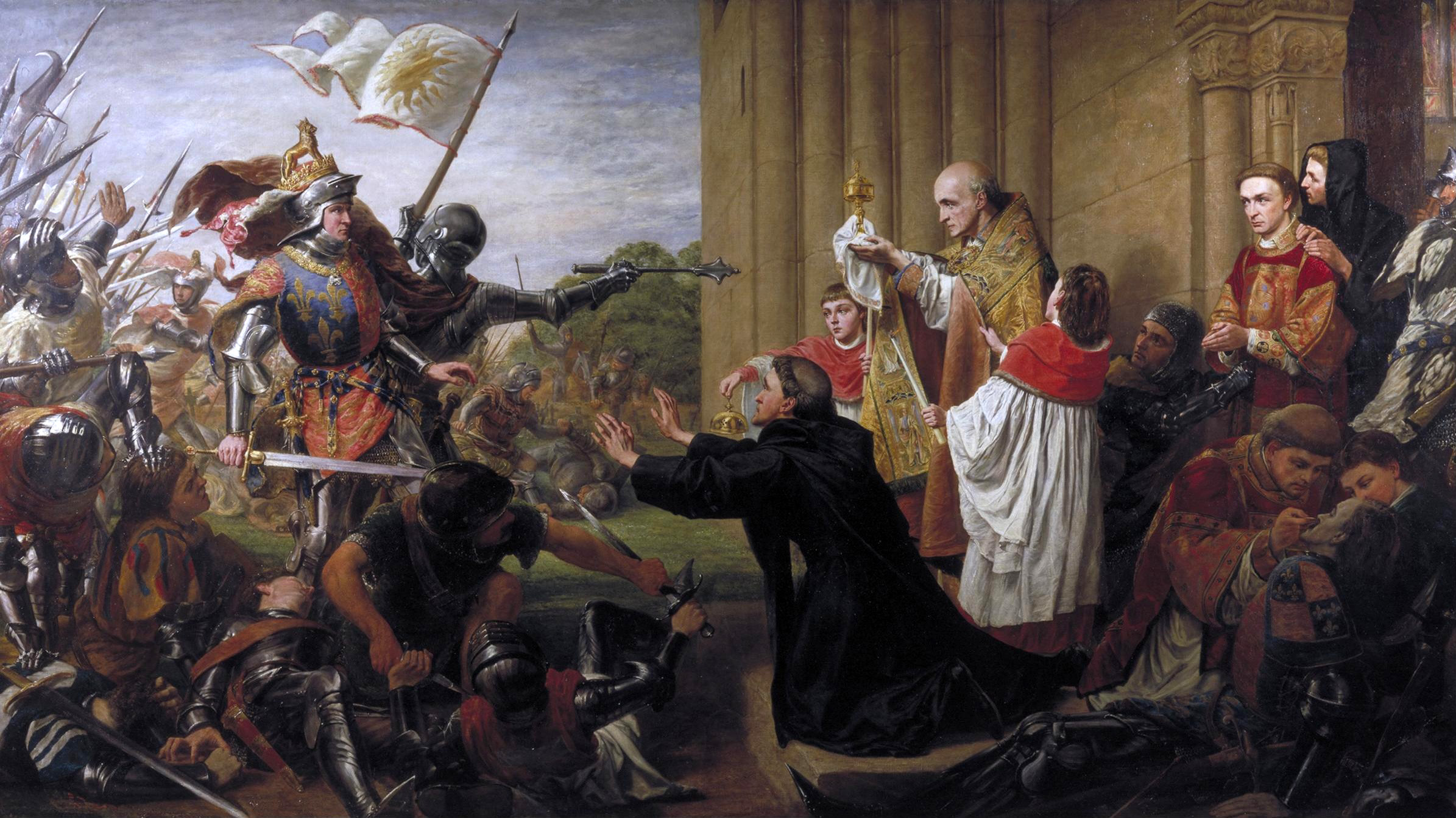
The Church as a Place of Refuge

The Sanctuary movement traced its roots to the ancient Judaic tradition of sanctuary. As movement member Mary Ann Lundy phrased it, "The idea comes from the original Judeo-Christian concept of Sanctuary, where persons fleeing the law could go to places of worship and be protected." In the Old Testament, God commanded Moses to set aside cities and places of refuge in Canaan where the persecuted could seek asylum. This concept can also be found in ancient Roman law, medieval canon law and British common law. Movement members also appealed to U.S. history, including the abolitionist movement, the Underground Railroad, the housing of Jews during World War II, the idea of the U.S. as a safe haven for immigrants and the civil rights struggles of the 1960s. For Sanctuary congregations, this justified violating federal law, and many members saw themselves as part of a larger transnational community. As Corbett wrote in 1983:

Because the refugees are here, a new exodus has already begun. Those enforced exiles are being joined by North American religious people who are voluntarily exiling themselves from a civil law without justice. Undocumented refugees and outlawed Christians and Jews are together forming a new exodus community that takes seriously a God who acts in history. Public sanctuary is an act that refuses to leave foreign policy to ambassadors and generals and compassion to the limits of law. The new exodus community is beginning to live a love that demands justice and acts with the power and authority that love carries. It is an authority rooted deep in Judeo-Christian tradition and US history itself.

== The Sanctuary Trials ==
The Immigration and Naturalization Service Agency (INS) decided to crack down on movement members by the mid-1980s, which culminated in a series of high-profile trials in Texas and Arizona.

In 1985, the INS launched a ten-month investigation, Operation Sojourner, sending paid informants into sanctuary communities to gain the trust of members, find information and report back to federal officials. In 1985, the government initiated criminal prosecutions against two activists in the Rio Grande Valley—Catholic layman Jack Elder and Methodist Stacey Merkt, both of whom provided sanctuary to Central Americans at Casa Óscar Romero in Brownsville, Texas.

In 1986, in the more publicized of the two cases, the Justice Department indicted 16 Americans and Mexicans on 71 counts of conspiracy and encouraging and aiding "illegal aliens to enter the United States by shielding, harboring and transporting them." This group included Father Quiñones from Our Lady Church in Nogales, Catholic Reverend Anthony Clark, Jim Corbett, John Fife, Sister Darlene Nicgorski, and a handful of other Sanctuary members and lay religious from participating churches.

In what became known as "The Sanctuary Trials", the defendants called upon their rights protected under both the U.S. Constitution and international law. They employed First Amendment free exercise claims, arguing they were simply living out their faith by providing refuge to their fellow brethren in need. As Nicgorski said on the day of her arraignment, "If I am guilty of anything, I am guilty of the Gospel." Defendants referenced passages in the Old and New Testaments, such as Leviticus 19:34 ("The stranger who sojourns with you shall be to you as the native among you, and you shall love him as yourself) and the story of Exodus ("What answer is there for the envoys of the nation? This: that the Lord has fixed Zion in her place, and the afflicted among God's people shall take refuge there" [Isaiah 14:32]).

The defense also called upon international law to defend their actions. They argued that the U.S. administration's policy toward Central Americans violated the 1980 Refugee Act, a law that reflected international norms set down in the 1951 U.N. Convention and 1967 Protocol Relating to the Status of Refugees.

The Sanctuary Trials spurred public outcry from many sympathetic to the movement. Demonstrations at INS facilities were held in San Francisco, Chicago, Milwaukee, Cincinnati, Philadelphia, New York City, and Tucson, among other places.

The court found eight movement members guilty on alien smuggling charges, but most received suspended sentences or underwent short house arrests. Supported by the Center for Constitutional Rights, a broad coalition of eight religious organizations also eventually brought suit against the U.S. attorney general and the head of the INS. Plaintiffs alleged, among other claims, that defendants violated domestic and international laws and movement members' First Amendment rights of free exercise. While the courts ruled in this case, American Baptist Churches v. Thornburgh, that international law did not apply and the government did not violate Sanctuary members' First Amendment rights, the movement won the public's sympathies and the government eventually granted asylum status to many of the refugees involved in the trial.

Furthermore, many Congressional Democrats took up the cause of the Central American refugees—due in large part to the lobbying and publicity efforts of Sanctuary members. In 1990, the House and Senate approved a bill granting temporary protected status (TPS) to Central Americans in need of safe haven, but not until the 1997 Nicaraguan Adjustment and Central American Relief Act did Congress allow fleeing Central Americans to apply for permanent residence.

== Trump era ==
In 2019 the Evangelical Lutheran Church in America declared itself a sanctuary denomination.

Dozens of people throughout the U.S. lived in sanctuary churches during Donald Trump's presidency, for example, at the Unitarian Universalist Church of Boulder.

== See also ==
- Asylum (disambiguation)
- Elvira Arellano
- James B. Burkholder
- Our Lady Queen of Angels Catholic Church
- Right of asylum
- Safe harbor
- Safe haven (disambiguation)
- Safe house
- Sanctuary cities
- Jose Figueroa deportation case
