= Diva Communications =

Diva Communications, Inc. is a programming and production company based in New York City. It specializes in production of film that explores social justice issues through a faith-based and humanistic lens. Founded by Dr. Debra Gonsher Vinik in 1985, Diva Communications has produced 20 documentaries, multiple short-from videos, and video series for use in the broadcast, cable, internet, and marketing industries. Diva Communications has won Emmy Awards for 6 of these films.

== History ==
Debra Gonsher Vinik started Diva Communications in 1985 after stints at Bravo, CBS and Twentieth Century Fox. The company initially made production deals with Orion Pictures and Fox Hills Video, and produced a series of home video offerings which included How to Read a Woman Like a Book, How to Become the Love of His Life, Bizarre Sports Incredible Feats, and Get Rich Quick By Beating the Odds.

In 1995, the company merged with David Vinik's Davideo Productions. Diva's first film production after the merger was Embracing Judaism: Reaching In, Reaching Out, Reaching Up. It resulted in the book Embracing Judaism: Narratives of Personal Faith published by Jason Aronson. Since then the company has written, created, filmed and edited 19 documentaries, all of which have aired on major television outlets and screened in film festivals worldwide. These films address such subjects as community and inclusion for persons with disabilities, hunger in America, intimate partner violence, healthcare and immigration and refugees.

Diva Communications won an Emmy Award for Beauty of Their Dreams., which aired on ABC affiliated stations in April through July 2016, and focused on the role of people of faith advocating for girls' education worldwide.

The company's 2017 documentary is Brightness of Noon: The Intersect of Faith, Immigration and Refugees - Part 1 which chronicles people of various faiths defending the rights of undocumented immigrants, asylees and refugees. The film premiered on ABC affiliated stations in February 2018 and ran through April. It focused on the works of faith leaders such as the Rev. John Fife, who helped create the Sanctuary Movement in the '80s; Rabbi Marisa James of New York City's Beit Simchat Torah, whose congregation has accompanied immigrants to court hearings; and the Rev. Jim Rigby whose Austin Sanctuary Network has provided shelter and protection to undocumented immigrants facing deportation.

Brightness of Noon- Part 2, narrated by actress and activist Sophia Bush (One Tree Hill, Chicago PD), shares the compassionate response of the majority of major faith-based institutions toward asylum seekers and refugees – a response that cares, nurtures, educates, often providing sanctuary for those living in fear of returning to their homelands. It was awarded a NY Emmy in 2019 and is scheduled to air again on ABC affiliated stations starting February 14, 2021.

Diva Communications also produces video content for web and mobile apps. In 2010, the company began creating the short videos Morning Thoughts and Evening Meditations for the Odyssey Networks' mobile app Call on Faith. Call on Faith was a library of short inspirational videos which is no longer operational.

Diva co-produced a short video series called the Wisdom of the Holidays alongside author and radio host Rabbi Irwin Kula of CLAL. They later completed a sequel, Wisdom of the Prayers.

Diva also curates the Mincha Moment website, a series of over 35 original web videos devoted to gratitude. In 2013, the Mincha Moment entitled Grateful For The Partial, featuring Rabbi Irwin Kula, was nominated for an Emmy Award. Dr. Gonsher Vinik was subsequently invited to contribute an article called “Practicing Gratitude” of WELCA's Bold Cafe. Debra Gonsher Vinik was asked to speak at WELCA's triennial in 2014 for about her documentary I Believe You; Faith's Response to Intimate Partner Violence at WELCA'S triennial in 2014, and joined their 2017 triennial to screen and to speak about Beauty of Their Dreams.

As Diva's work is primarily interfaith, in addition to WELCA, it has fostered relationships with faiths across the spectrum including Conservative and Reform Judaism, Roman Catholic, United Methodist, Muslim, Presbyterian, and Baha'i, among others.

Diva Communications is currently in production on Hurting Inside: Women, Faith and the Opioid Epidemic, airing in 2021 on ABC-affiliated stations nationwide, a one-hour multi-faith documentary exploring the underreported struggles of women who suffer from opioid use disorder (OUD); the stigma surrounding their addiction and the people of faith aiding in their recovery.

== Films ==
Films produced by Diva Communications have aired on television networks such as PBS, NBC and ABC.

Brightness of Noon: The Intersect of Faith, Immigration and Refugees - Part 2 (2018)	ABC	2019 NY Emmy
Brightness of Noon: The Intersect of Faith, Immigration and Refugees - Part 1 (2017)	ABC
The Beauty of Their Dreams (2016)	ABC	2017 NY Emmy, RNA 1st Place
Every Word Has Power (2015)	ABC	Emmy Nomination, 2016, RNA 1st Place
All of the Above (2014)	ABC
Divine Prescription (2013)	ABC	2014 NY Emmy
A Peace of Bread (2011)	ABC	RNA 2nd place
I Believe You: Faiths’ Response to Intimate Partner Violence (2010)	ABC & NBC	Emmy Nomination, RNA 3rd
A Place for All: Faith and Community for Persons with Disabilities (2009)	ABC & NBC	Emmy Nomination, De Rose Hinkhouse 1st place
Yearning to Belong (2009)	ABC & NBC	2009 NY Emmy
Everyone Prays at Holy Etchmiadzin (2008)	ABC & PBS	Emmy Nomination
And the Gates Opened: Women in the Rabbinate (2007)	ABC & NBC	2008 NY Emmy
The Eternal Light: A Historical Retrospective (2006)	ABC & NBC	2007 NY Emmy
Legacy of Our Ancestors: The 350th Anniversary of Jews in Early America (2004)	ABC & NBC
The Highest Commandment (2003)	ABC & NBC
Faith First (2002)	ABC & NBC	Emmy Nomination
A Sacred Noise (2001)	ABC & NBC
To God’s Ear: Song and Music of the Jewish Liturgy (2000)	ABC & NBC	Emmy Nomination
Grateful, Am I, To You (1999)	ABC & NBC	1st prize, Education Category, 7th Annual International Jewish Film Festival
Embracing Judaism: Reaching In, Reaching Out, Reaching Up (1995)	ABC & NBC

== Awards ==
Diva's films have won six local Emmy awards and twelve nominations. Diva's most recent NY Emmy was for Brightness of Noon - Part 2 in 2019. Diva's film The Beauty of Their Dreams won the 2017 NY Emmy. In 2014, their documentary Divine Prescription: Stories of Faith, Health, and Community won an Emmy award. In February 2013, Diva's short web video, Grateful For The Partial, was nominated for a New York Emmy for Best Religion News/Feature. Diva also won a 2009 NY Emmy for Yearning to Belong; a 2008 NY Emmy for And the Gates Opened: Women in the Rabbinate; and a 2007 NY Emmy for The Eternal Light: A Historical Retrospective.

Diva won the 2010 DeRose-Hinkhouse Award for Best in Broadcasting for the documentary, A Place for All: Faith and Community for Persons with Disabilities. The film tells the stories of disabled individuals working to make their faith communities more inclusive of them.
