= Tempest DuJour =

American drag performer

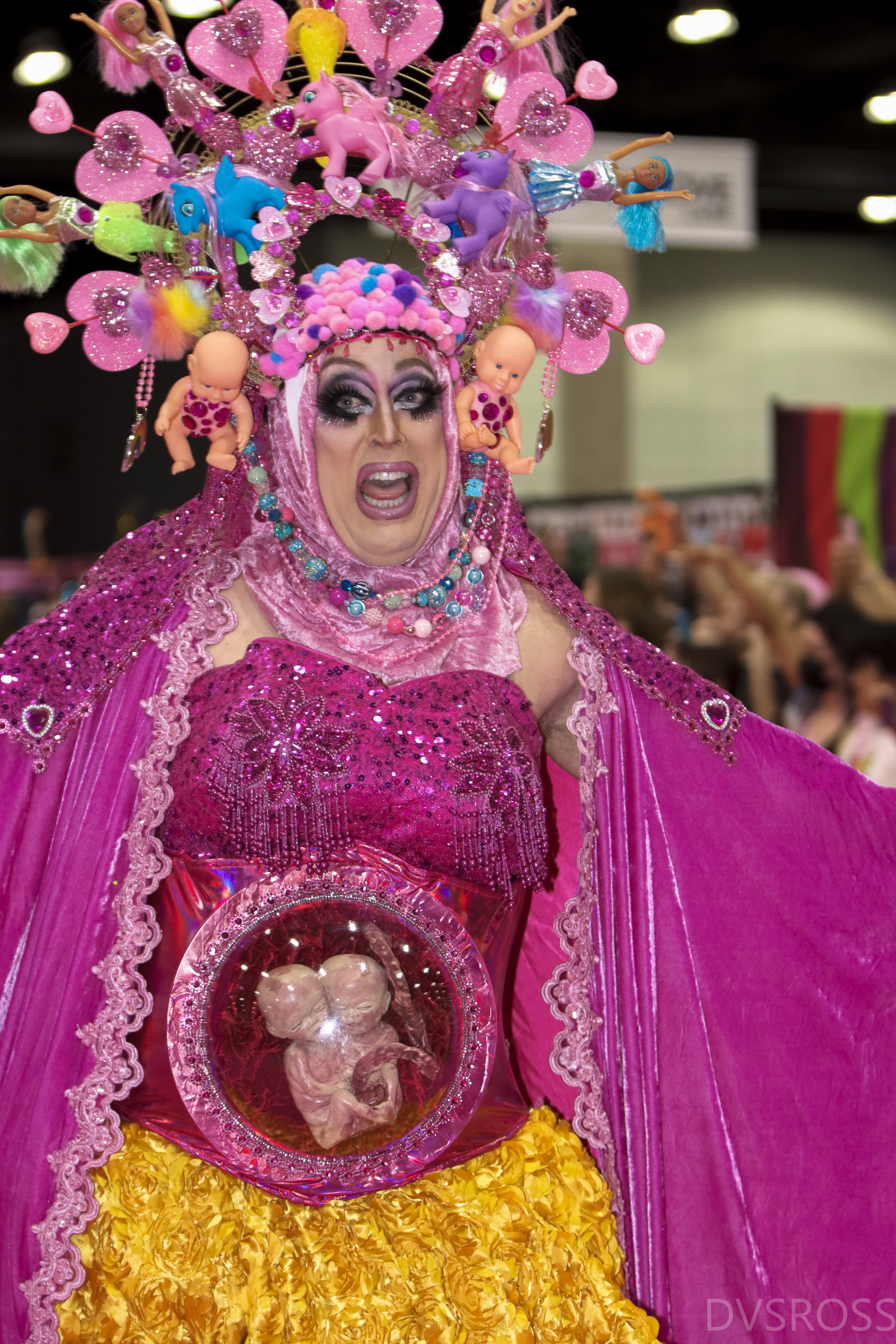
- Tempest DuJour at RuPaul's DragCon LA, 2022
- Born: Patrick Lee Holt; September 1, 1967 (age 59); Durham, North Carolina, U.S.
- Education: Brigham Young University (BA); University of North Carolina School of the Arts (MFA)
- Television: RuPaul's Drag Race
- Children: 2

Tempest DuJour is the stage name of Patrick Lee Holt (born September 1, 1967), an American drag performer most known for competing on season 7 of RuPaul's Drag Race. Holt is also an associate professor at the University of Arizona.

== Career ==
Tempest DuJour has performed in Tucson, and hosted Retro Game Show Night at Club Congress, as of 2013. She competed on the seventh season (2015) of RuPaul's Drag Race. She was the oldest contestant (age 46 at the time) and the first eliminated in the competition. Tempest DuJour remains the second oldest contestant to compete on the show, as of 2021. She appeared in episodes of season 10 and season 14.

Tempest DuJour appeared in the film Cherry Pop, directed by Assaad Yacoub. She was named Best Drag Queen by Tucson Weekly five times in a row, including in 2019, 2020, and 2021.

Outside of drag, Holt is an educator. He was an associate professor at the University of Arizona's School of Theatre, Film and Television, as of 2014.

== Personal life ==
After earning a graduate degree from the University of North Carolina School of the Arts, Holt moved to New York City, working under the guidance of Paul Tazewell. Holt and his husband have two children.

Holt's drag name is inspired by The Tempest by William Shakespeare, and he has cited Phyllis Diller and Milton Berle as personal inspirations towards his drag persona.

== Filmography ==
=== Film ===
- Cherry Pop

=== Television ===
- RuPaul's Drag Race (season 7)
- RuPaul's Drag Race (season 14)

== See also ==
- List of people from Tucson, Arizona
- List of University of Arizona people
