= Safe harbor =

A safe harbor or harbour is literally a "place of shelter and safety, esp. for ships". It is used in many contexts:

== Film and television ==
- "The Safe Harbor", a 2006 episode of The O.C. television series
- Safe Harbor, a 2006 made-for-television movie starring Tracey Gold and Steve Bacic
- Safe harbor (broadcasting), established in 1978 in the United States, the time period in a television schedule during which programs with adult content can air
- Safe Harbor (film), a 2009 American television movie starring Treat Williams and Nancy Travis
- Safe Harbor (1999 TV series), a 1999 American television drama starring Gregory Harrison and Rue McClanahan
- Safe Harbor (2025 TV series), a 2025 crime drama television series
- Safe Harbour (film), a 2007 American direct-to-video film directed by Bill Corcoran
- Safe Harbour (TV series), a 2017 Australian television drama series

== Law and regulations ==
- Safe harbor (law), a provision of a statute or a regulation that specifies that certain conduct will be deemed not to violate a given rule
  - International Safe Harbor Privacy Principles, a process for U.S. companies to comply with the EU Directive on the protection of personal data
  - DMCA safe harbor, which shields online service providers from liability for facilitating their users' copyright infringement as long as they comply with certain requirements, such as accepting "take down" notices
- Place of refuge for ships, also called a safe harbor, where a ship in distress can shelter

== Publishing ==
- Safe Harbour (novel), a 2003 novel by Danielle Steel
- Safe Harbor (novel), a 2004 novel by Radclyffe

== Places ==
- Safe Harbour, Newfoundland and Labrador, Canada
- Safe Harbor, Pennsylvania, U.S.
- Safe Harbor Dam, Susquehanna River, U.S.

== Other uses ==
- Safe harbor (commerce), function as a form of shark repellent used to thwart hostile takeovers
- Safe Harbor Certified Seafood, a brand of mercury tested seafood products

== See also ==
- Safe haven (disambiguation)
- Safe house
