= Stacey Merkt =

American human rights activist (1954 –)

Stacey Merkt (born 1954) is an American human rights activist imprisoned for her work on behalf of the Sanctuary movement. In 1984 she became a controversial national figure for helping migrants from El Salvador seek refuge in the United States. Beyond the political moment of her arrests and later incarceration, New York Times reporter Robert Reinhold called her, "...something of a symbol in the conflict between the Federal Government and the growing movement among American churches to aid undocumented aliens..." In the book Sanctuary: The New Underground Railroad, Renny Golden, who founded The Religious Task Force on Central America, and Michael McConnell called her "...the first modern railroad conductor arrested...". Amnesty International adopted her cause, calling her a "prisoner of conscience."

Merkt was volunteering at the Casa Óscar Romero shelter in San Benito, Texas, as a lay Methodist in a Catholic and interfaith organization. On February 17 1984 she and a Catholic sister, Dianne Muhlenkemp, and Dallas Times Herald reporter Jack Fischer were stopped while driving an undocumented woman, man, and baby who faced deportation procedures to apply for asylum, which was not possible where they were living. All three Americans were arrested and charged with transporting illegal aliens. Charges against the other two were dropped, and Merkt received a 90-day suspended sentence. She was re-arrested along with Jack Elder the following December for transporting two adults and three children for the same purpose, and after a trial was sentenced to 179 days in jail. Even though she was pregnant at the time, she served time in Harlingen, Texas, but was released in April of 1987 because of complications with the pregnancy, and she completed the remaining 83 days of her sentence at home under house arrest. Richard Ostling concluded that, "... the prosecutions, far from stemming the movement, have given it new prominence... Tens of millions of Americans who never knew this was an issue now know about it. And they know it is a major church-state issue, probably the major one of the 1980s."
