= Sosa–Carrillo–Fremont House =

Historic house in Arizona, United States

- U.S. National Register of Historic Places
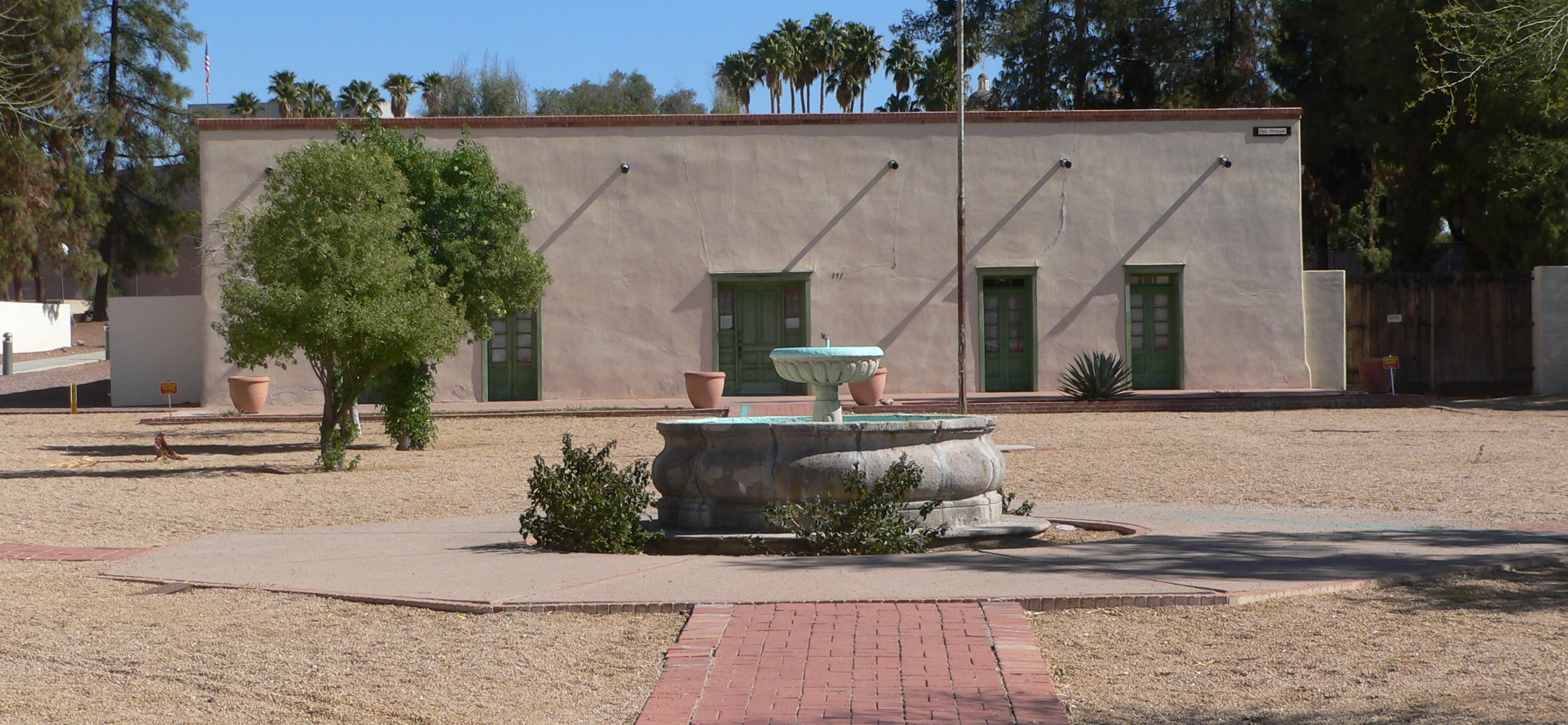

- Location within Arizona Location within the United States
- Location: 145-153 S. Main St., Tucson, Arizona
- Coordinates: 32°13′10″N 110°58′25″W
- Area: 0.5 acres (0.20 ha)
- Built: 1858
- Architectural style: Zaguan Type
- NRHP reference No.: 71000116
- Added to NRHP: June 3, 1971

The house at 145–153 S Main St, Tucson, Arizona, officially listed in the National Register of Historic Places as the Sosa–Carrillo–Fremont House, is known locally for its association with John Charles Frémont, former Territorial Governor of Arizona.

The house was originally listed on the National Register as the John Charles Fremont, Casa del Gobernador, House in 1971, but the official listing name was later changed to Sosa–Carrillo–Fremont House to better reflect the building's association with several important families in the region's history.

The building is also known as the Carrillo House, the Leopoldo Carrillo House, and the Carrillo–Frémont House. The building is now owned by the Arizona Historical Society and is operated as a museum.

== See also ==
- Leopoldo Carrillo
