= Debra Gonsher Vinik =

American filmmaker

Dr. Gonsher Vinik at a speaking engagement in 2026

Debra Gonsher Vinik, Ph.D. is an American documentary filmmaker, television producer, speaker, educator, and author whose documentaries have explored religion, healthcare, education, addiction, disability, and other social issues. She is the founder and president of Diva Communications, an independent production company established in 1985. Since founding the company, she has produced more than twenty nationally distributed documentaries, six of which have received New York Emmy Awards.

In addition to her work in broadcasting, Gonsher Vinik served for more than thirty years on the faculty of the City University of New York, where she chaired the Communications Arts & Sciences Department at Bronx Community College for twenty-one years and later served as Humanities Division Coordinator for six years. She is the author of Embracing Judaism: Personal Narratives of Renewed Faith and Career Speak: Articulation and Presentation and co-author of The Community College Guide: The Essential Reference from Application to Graduation.

In the 2020s, her work increasingly focused on gratitude as both a personal practice and an area of scientific inquiry. Through documentaries, public speaking, and educational initiatives, she has examined the role gratitude plays in resilience, trauma recovery, caregiving, addiction recovery, and emotional well-being.

== Early Career ==
Gonsher Vinik began her career in television production before moving into executive leadership within the home video industry. She served as Director of Production at CBS/Fox Video, overseeing the development and production of educational and special-interest programming during the rapid expansion of the home video market. She later became Vice President of Scanline Video, where she continued producing educational and documentary programming.

In 1985, she founded Diva Communications, Inc., an independent production company dedicated to creating documentaries and educational media addressing social, medical, educational, and religious issues. The company became known for producing films that combined journalistic storytelling with public education, frequently partnering with nonprofit organizations, universities, healthcare institutions, and religious organizations.

== Documentary Filmmaking ==
Throughout her career, Gonsher Vinik has produced documentaries centered on people confronting extraordinary circumstances. Rather than focusing primarily on institutions or policy, her films frequently examine how individuals navigate adversity while maintaining hope, purpose, and connection.

Her documentaries have explored a wide range of subjects, reflecting Gonsher Vinik's interest in the intersection of personal experience and broader social issues. Rather than focusing on institutions alone, her films use individual stories to examine faith, healthcare, education, addiction, disability, immigration, recovery, and resilience.

Among her best-known productions is Attention Must Be Paid: Women Lost in the Opioid Crisis, a documentary examining the unique experiences of women affected by opioid use disorder. The film brought national attention to the intersection of addiction, trauma, motherhood, and recovery and became widely used by healthcare providers, educators, and advocacy organizations.

Her documentary Moving Heaven and Earth explored the efforts of a group of Ugandans, called the Abayudaya to gain acceptance in the world wide Jewish community. Other productions have examined the lives of Holocaust survivors, people living with disabilities, educators, physicians, clergy, families affected by addiction, and communities responding to social change.

Her work has been distributed nationally through ABC affiliate stations, PBS outlets, the Hallmark Channel, and educational distributors, and has been screened at universities, hospitals, film festivals, religious organizations, and professional conferences throughout the United States and internationally.

A recurring characteristic of Gonsher Vinik's filmmaking is her emphasis on allowing individuals to tell their own stories, often using personal narratives to illuminate broader cultural, medical, ethical, and spiritual questions.

== Gratitude ==
Gratitude has been a central part of Gonsher Vinik's personal life since the mid-1990s, long before it became the primary focus of her documentary work. Over the following decades, she developed a daily gratitude practice that eventually inspired the creation of the Mincha Moment, an initiative encouraging people to pause briefly each day to recognize moments of gratitude amid ordinary life.

Building on that long-standing personal practice, Gonsher Vinik gradually incorporated gratitude into her professional work. Years of interviewing people who had experienced profound loss—including Holocaust survivors, parents who had lost children, caregivers, veterans, and individuals recovering from addiction—led her to explore a question that would become central to her later documentaries: why do some people remain grateful despite extraordinary suffering?

Her subsequent research and interviews with psychologists, neuroscientists, physicians, clergy, and Buddhist teachers became the foundation for the documentary projects I Thank, Therefore I Am and Notice. Name. Thank: The Gratitude Effect, which examine gratitude through science, spirituality, medicine, and lived experience.

She also began speaking nationally on gratitude, resilience, and well-being, integrating stories from her documentaries with current research in psychology and neuroscience. Through these presentations, she argues that gratitude is less an emotional state than a deliberate practice of noticing what remains meaningful, even during periods of uncertainty or loss.

== Academic Career ==
Parallel to her filmmaking career, Gonsher Vinik spent more than three decades as a professor at Bronx Community College, part of the City University of New York.

She served as Chair of the Communications Arts & Sciences Department for twenty-one years and later as Humanities Division Coordinator for six years. During her academic career she taught communication, television production, media studies, and public speaking while mentoring generations of students pursuing careers in journalism, broadcasting, education, and media production.

== Publications ==
Gonsher Vinik is the author of:

- Embracing Judaism: Personal Narratives of Renewed Faith
- Career Speak: Articulation and Presentation

She is also co-author of:

- The Community College Guide: The Essential Reference from Application to Graduation

== Professional Service ==
Gonsher Vinik has served as Secretary-Treasurer of the Interfaith Broadcasting Commission, a nonprofit organization that distributes religious and educational programming to commercial television stations throughout the United States. Through the organization, her documentaries have reached national audiences via ABC affiliate stations and other broadcasters.

She has also collaborated with healthcare organizations, educational institutions, religious organizations, and nonprofit groups on documentary productions designed to promote public education and dialogue around complex social issues.

== Awards and Honors ==
Gonsher Vinik's documentaries have received six New York Emmy Awards and numerous Emmy nominations from the National Academy of Television Arts and Sciences.

Her films have also received recognition from organizations in journalism, religion, healthcare, and education, and have been used by universities, medical schools, faith communities, and nonprofit organizations as educational resources.

== Films ==
Listen to the Silence: Women Trapped in the Opioid Epidemic (2023)	ABC	2-part documentary
Attention Must Be Paid (2022)		90 minute feature documentary
Brightness of Noon, Parts I & II (2018–2019)	ABC	Emmy Award for Part II
The Beauty of Their Dreams (2016)	ABC	Emmy Award)
Every Word Has Power'' (2015)	ABC	(Emmy Nomination)
All of the Above' (2014)	ABC
Divine Prescription (2013)	ABC	2014 NY Emmy
A Peace of Bread (2011)	ABC	RNA 2nd place
I Believe You: Faiths' Response to Intimate Partner Violence(2010)	ABC & NBC	Emmy Nomination, RNA 3rd
A Place for All: Faith and Community for Persons with Disabilities (2009)	ABC & NBC	Emmy Nomination, De Rose Hinkhouse 1st place
Yearning to Belong (2009)	ABC & NBC	2009 NY Emmy
Everyone Prays at Holy Etchmiadzin (2008)	ABC & PBS	Emmy Nomination
And the Gates Opened: Women in the Rabbinate (2007)	ABC & NBC	2008 NY Emmy
The Eternal Light: A Historical Retrospective (2006)	ABC & NBC	2007 NY Emmy
Legacy of Our Ancestors: The 350th Anniversary of Jews in Early America (2004)	ABC & NBC
The Highest Commandment (2003)	ABC & NBC
Faith First (2002)	ABC & NBC	Emmy Nomination
A Sacred Noise (2001)	ABC & NBC
To God's Ear: Song and Music of the Jewish Liturgy (2000)	ABC & NBC	Emmy Nomination
Grateful, Am I, To You (1999)	ABC & NBC	1st prize, Education Category, 7th Annual International Jewish Film Festival
Embracing Judaism: Reaching In, Reaching Out, Reaching Up (1995)	ABC & NBC
