= James A. Corbett =

American philosopher and rancher (1933–2001)

James A. "Jim" Corbett (October 8, 1933 – August 2, 2001) was an American rancher, writer, Quaker, philosopher, and human rights activist and a co-founder of the Sanctuary movement. He was born in Casper, Wyoming, and died near Benson, Arizona.

== Life ==
The son of a world history teacher and a home economics teacher, Corbett was descended from European-American settlers and Choctaw Indians. He graduated from Colgate University and got his master's degree in philosophy from Harvard. Jim Corbett married Mary Lynn Shreffler, whom he knew from high school in Casper, Wyoming in 1955 after graduating from Harvard with his M. A. After being stationed at Fort Bliss, El Paso, Texas, Jim Corbett worked for the US Forest Service, herded sheep in the Bighorn Basin of Wyoming, and helped his parents with a small ranch they had recently acquired outside Sierra Vista, Arizona. During this time Corbett also attended the University of Washington in Seattle to pursue his Ph.D. in Philosophy for two quarters. Jim Corbett was attending Library School at U.S.C. in Los Angeles when he met his second wife, Patricia Corbett. He subsequently held positions at Cochise College, Chico State, and the John Woolman School. Corbett continued to herd goats and cows until his death. He did research into beekeeping and goat husbandry. He also was librarian and philosophy instructor at Cochise College in Arizona. In the early 1960s Jim Corbett became a Quaker and an opponent of the Vietnam War.

== Sanctuary Movement ==
In 1981, while living in Arizona, he became aware of refugees fleeing from civil wars in El Salvador and Guatemala. They were crossing the border from Mexico into Arizona and seeking political asylum. At the time, very few of these refugees were receiving protection, as the U.S. government was funding the governments of the countries from which the refugees were fleeing, and immigration judges were instructed by the State Department to deny most asylum petitions. Together with other human rights activists including Presbyterian pastor John Fife, Corbett started a small movement in Arizona to assist these people coming across the border, by providing assistance, transportation, and shelter. These activists, under the auspices of churches and Quaker meetings, cited religious precedent of protecting people fleeing persecution, as well as the Geneva Conventions barring countries from deporting refugees back to countries in the middle of civil wars (non-refoulement), to justify their actions. They found support for their work in Quaker meetings (congregations) in Arizona and Chicago, Illinois, as well as south Texas. Eventually, other communities in many states, including California, Pennsylvania, Vermont, Washington, and others. This movement, which became known as the Sanctuary movement, eventually involved over 500 congregations, and helped hundreds if not thousands of refugees find freedom in the U.S.

Corbett and ten others around Tucson, Arizona were arrested for their work, as it violated U.S. immigration laws. He was eventually acquitted. He continued to assist refugees and to write on various topics of social justice.

== Books ==
Corbett was among the most intellectual of the movement's proponents, and he wrote and published widely on the topic. His two books were Goatwalking (1991) and Sanctuary for All Life (posthumously published in 2005).

== Environmental activism ==
Jim Corbett is credited with helping a group of ranchers in southeast Arizona get beyond the long-standing rancor between ranchers and environmentalists and work together to protect open space in the early 1990s.

== See also ==
- American philosophy
- List of American philosophers
