= Nicaraguan Adjustment and Central American Relief Act =

1997 United States immigration law

The Nicaraguan Adjustment and Central American Relief Act or NACARA (Title II of Pub. L. 105–100 (text) (PDF)) is a U.S. law passed in 1997 that provides various forms of immigration benefits and relief from deportation to certain Nicaraguans, Cubans, Salvadorans, Guatemalans, nationals of former Soviet bloc countries and their dependents who had applied for asylum. As these Central Americans overwhelmed the U.S. asylum program in the mid-1990s, their cases were left for NACARA to address.

The legislation was authored by Cuban-American Florida congressman Lincoln Díaz-Balart and was included as part of the D.C. Appropriations Act for FY 1998.

Section 202 deals with Nicaraguans (~95% of Section 202 beneficiaries) and Cubans (~5%), whereas Section 203 deals with Salvadorans (~65% of Sec. 203 beneficiaries), Guatemalans (~30%), and former Soviet Union nationals (~5%). Persons granted NACARA benefits are counted as legal permanent resident immigrants.

Section 202 allowed for spouses, children under 21 and any unmarried adult children to benefit from the amnesty program along with the original filer. The program was made available to 160,000 Nicaraguans and Cubans who were eligible according to the Immigration and Naturalization Services. Section 202 took effect in 1998. Section 203 was available to 300,000 Salvadorans, Guatemalans, and nationals of the former Soviet Union bloc who made up 10,000, or 3.3%, of the population who was eligible for relief under the Nicaraguan Adjustment and Central American Relief Act. Section 203 took effect in 1999. According to Congressional Research Report documents, between 1998 and 2020, 261,665 people attained lawful permanent residence (LPR) as a result of the relief act. Of that group, 71,530 were under Section 202 and 191,165 were under 203. This shows that the act had some success, but not all eligible persons succeeded.

There were differences for people who applied under the two different sections. People who applied under Section 202 received a fee waiver in which they did not have to pay for their application if the person had an income below the federal poverty line whereas families who applied under Section 203 did not have a fee waiver. The contrasts in the two Sections lead to a difference in the applicants who applied compared to those who were eligible. There was a higher take-up rate under Section 202 with 37% of applicants who were eligible under receiving amnesty compared to 17% of applicants receiving amnesty under Section 203.

The Nicaraguan Adjustment and Central American Relief Act stated that Nicaraguans, Cubans, Salvadorans, Guatemalans, nationals of former Soviet bloc countries, and their dependents are able to become legal permanent residents of the United States provided that they were registered asylums seekers who had stayed in the United States for at least 5 years since December 1, 1995. Some conditions regulate this clause. Even though the program was meant to have a tremendous reach to many immigrants, it was found that less than 70,000 asylees were legalized through the Nicaraguan Adjustment and Central American Relief Act from its creation to 2009 according to the Center for Migration Studies.

== History ==
Immigrants from the Western Hemisphere were granted more leeway in entering the U.S. since no quotas were implemented for countries in the Americas unlike Europe and Asia. The U.S. began to change their policies and did create a quota system for western countries seeing as many immigrants from Mexico and Cuba were entering in droves. Cubans were allowed to enter the U.S. with little resistance since the U.S. was sympathetic of Cubans living under Fidel Castro's regime. In an attempt to aid Cubans, the U.S. created the Cuban Adjustment Act that was passed in 1966 that gave Cubans a status in the U.S. that allowed them to live and work freely in the country.

The Nicaraguan Adjustment and Central American Relief Act was created and targeted towards asylees from Cuba and also Nicaragua. Along with those two countries, asylees from former Soviet bloc countries were given the opportunity to adjust their status. Salvadorians and Guatemalans were not originally meant to benefit from the program despite also having issues in their countries that resulted in them seeking asylum in the U.S., but they were added into being beneficiaries of NACARA.

Guatemalans and Salvadorians caught the attention of the U.S. federal legislature during the 1980s. The immigrants that were attempting to enter were applying for political asylee status, seeking the protection of the U.S. The U.S. government was providing military and economic assistance to El Salvador and Guatemala due to the violent turmoil that plagued both countries due to guerilla warfare. Despite the assistance to quell the violence, Salvadorians and Guatemalans were denied asylum in the U.S. with 97-99% being rejected by the U.S. The U.S. refused to grant asylum and opted to help through another means because the U.S. would not need to fully acknowledge the violence that was happening. If the U.S. government did recognize the violence in public, that would mean the U.S. recognized that human rights violations were being conducted in Guatemala and El Salvador. The U.S. would then have an international and national obligation to allow entry to the asylees.

Advocates in the U.S. fought for Guatemalans and Salvadorians by suing on their behalf to overturn the denials for asylee status. It took numerous attempts and various cases, but eventually, Guatemalans and Salvadorians gained some success. The most well-known case, that was later added to Title II of the Nicaraguan Adjustment and Central American Relief Act, was American Baptist Churches v. Thornburgh. The case originally was not arguing for immigration reform but simply arguing that the U.S. government was in violation of international and national law by refusing to provide asylee protection to Salvadorians and Guatemalans. U.S. government officials had previously proclaimed they would prosecute churches who provided aid to Salvadorians and Guatemalans. American Baptist Churches were providing aid to Salvadorians and Guatemalans which resulted in them being prosecuted, but they argued that the U.S. government was not aiding or acknowledging nor helping the asylees so they stepped forward to help.

After arguing the case for five years, it was settled in 1990 in which the Immigration and Naturalization Services claimed they were going to reform the asylee system to be fairer for all political asylees which would grant equal opportunity to Guatemalans and Salvadorians. With the asylee services becoming more just, there was also the creation of Temporary Protected Status (TPS) that came as a result of Thornburgh. TPS became part of the 1990 Immigration Act which allowed for people who fled their countries due to life threatening conditions to remain in the U.S. to work without fear of deportation under a temporary status. TPS was specifically intended for Salvadorans and Guatemalans. They were granted a status, but they were still vulnerable to immigration policies. More people started to use Temporary Protected Status to remain in the U.S. by filing as asylum seekers.

Due to the number of people filing for TPS after American Baptist Churches, there had been many unheard cases. NACARA primarily helped Cubans and Nicaraguans since they benefitted the most under Section 202 with their cases being decided in a timely manner and many family members benefiting from the amnesty. Guatemalans and Salvadorans had to file under Section 203 in which their cases were decided on a case-by-case basis depending on the evidence of the cases and not all of their family members were allowed to receive amnesty.

Nonetheless, the Temporary Protected Status was not a long term solution and expired after two years. The State Department was forced to face the challenge of what the next move was for Guatemalans and Salvadorians under TPS. The State Department in response to the expiration created the deferred enforced departure (DED) which would extend up to 1996. DED essentially extended TPS and stopped any mass deportations for Central Americans until Congress could form a solution. The Illegal Immigration Reform and Immigrant Responsibility Act of 1996 (IIRIRA) did not consider asylees that were granted temporary status as a class suit from Thornburgh, meaning that about 240,000 asylees were excluded from IIRIRA. There status remained in limbo. However, advocates of Central Americans were joined in support by U.S. and Central American government officials, and Cuban activists to lobby for a new legislation that would include Nicaraguans, Cubans, Eastern Europeans, Guatemalans, and Salvadorians which then created the Nicaraguan Adjustment and Central American Relief Act.

=== Statistics ===
Year	NACARA 202	NACARA 203
1998	1	0
1999	11,267	573
2000	23,641	8,015
2001	18,926	19,349
2002	9,496	21,603
2003	2,577	27,100
2004	2,292	30,136
2005	1,155	15,597
2006	661	25,950
2007	340	11,779
2008	296	8,359
2009	296	4,764
2010	248	3,705
2011	158	3,224
2012	183	2,803
2013	138	1,607
2014	70	1,656
Total	71,745	186,220
