= Safe house =

Secret place for sanctuary

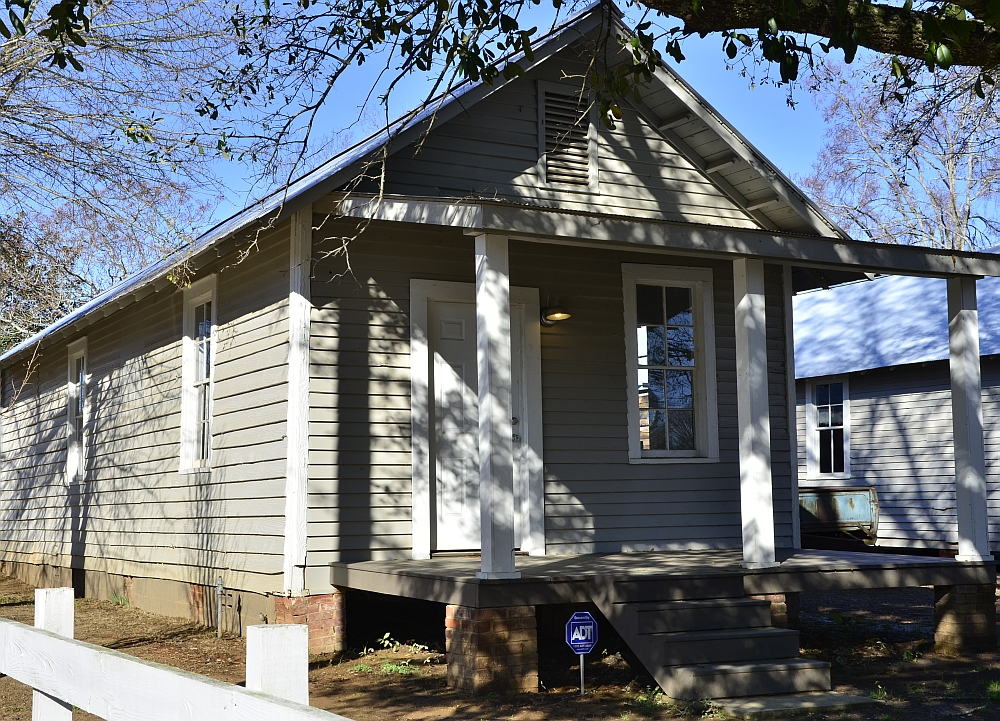
The house where Martin Luther King Jr. hid after preaching in 1968 is now the Safe House Museum. Greensboro, Hale County, Alabama, United States

A safe house (also spelled safehouse) is a dwelling, building, or other secure location used as a place of refuge, concealment, or protection. Safe houses are usually chosen because they appear ordinary or unremarkable from the outside, allowing people to stay there without attracting attention. They may be used by individuals who are in danger, people avoiding surveillance, law enforcement agencies, intelligence services, resistance movements, or criminal organizations.

Safe houses can serve several purposes depending on the situation. They may provide temporary shelter for witnesses, informants, undercover agents, political dissidents, refugees, or people escaping abuse or persecution. In espionage and military contexts, safe houses may be used for secret meetings, hiding personnel, storing equipment, or planning operations. In criminal contexts, the term can also refer to a location used to hide fugitives, stolen goods, or illegal activity.

The security of a safe house often depends on secrecy, limited access, and its ability to blend into the surrounding area. A safe house may look like a normal apartment, house, business, or rural property. Some safe houses may include added security features, such as reinforced doors, hidden rooms, escape routes, surveillance equipment, or secure communication systems. However, many are simply ordinary-looking places whose main protection comes from not being noticed.

The concept of safe houses has existed for centuries and has been associated with wartime resistance networks, underground escape routes, intelligence operations, and witness protection programs. In popular culture, safe houses are often shown in spy films, crime stories, and thrillers as secret hideouts used by agents, fugitives, or people being protected from danger.

== Historical usage ==
It may also refer to:

- in the jargon of law enforcement and intelligence agencies, a secure location, suitable for hiding witnesses, agents, informants, or other persons perceived as being in danger
- a place where people may go to avoid prosecution of their activities by authorities. Osama bin Laden's compound in Abbottabad has been described as a "safe house".
- a location where a trusted adult, family or charity organization provides a haven for victims of domestic abuse (see also: men and/or women's shelter or refuge)
- Right of asylum
- sanctuary in medieval law
- sanctuary in modern times
- Church asylum

Safe houses were an integral part of the Underground Railroad, the network of safe house locations that were used to assist slaves in escaping to the primarily northern free states in the 19th-century United States. Some houses were marked with a statue of an African American man holding a lantern, called "the Lantern Holder".

Safe houses also provided a refuge for victims of Nazi persecution and for escaping prisoners of war. Victims, such as Anne Frank and her family, were harbored clandestinely for extended periods of time. Other Jewish victims that were hidden from the Germans include Philip Slier and his extended family and friends.

== See also ==
- Blockhouse
- Citadel
- Closed city
- Gated community
- Hideout (disambiguation)
- Refuge
- Retreat (survivalism)
- Right of asylum
- Safe harbor (disambiguation)
- Safe haven (disambiguation)
- Safe room
- Second Amendment sanctuary
- Separation barrier
- Trap house
- Walled city

== Sources ==
- Slier, Philip "Flip" & Slier, Deborah. Hidden Letters: The Hidden Letters of Flip Slier. Star Bright Books, 2008. ISBN 1887734880.
