= Safe harbor (commerce) =

In the context of commercial takeovers, safe harbors function as a form of shark repellent used to thwart hostile takeovers. Under implementation of this provision, a target company will merge with a company that would threaten anti-trust action.

== United States ==
The Private Securities Litigation Reform Act of 1995 includes safe-harbor provisions to protect companies which make financial and investment forecasts in public markets.

The United States Department of Commerce runs a certification program which it calls Safe Harbor and which aims to harmonize data privacy practices in trading between the United States of America and the stricter privacy controls of the European Union Directive 95/46/EC on the protection of personal data. For more information, see Safe Harbor Principles.

The Public Health Service publishes a set of Safe Harbor rules within Title 42, Code of Federal Regulations, to preclude Life Science companies from withholding important medical information from the public for fear of being prosecuted for Medicare violations. It is illegal for a firm to advertise or promote a drug, biologic, or medical device for a purpose other than an indication approved by the Food and Drug Administration; recommending such off-label use for a product subject to reimbursement under Medicare or Medicaid constitutes felony fraud. Safe Harbor establishes rules defining when and how such information may be published (for example, medical journal reports of clinical trials) without the company running afoul of advertising and marketing restrictions.
