= James B. Burkholder =

Retired US Army officer and community activist (1918–2006)

- Born: October 22, 1918; Harrisburg, Pennsylvania
- Died: May 9, 2006 (aged 87); Arizona
- Education: Wharton School at University of Pennsylvania
- Occupation: United States Army officer
- Years active: c.1940–1973
- Spouse: Lucille Burkholder (m.1941)
- Children: 6

James B. Burkholder (October 22, 1918 – May 9, 2006) was a United States Army officer who, after retiring, became involved in peace and social justice issues.

Born in Harrisburg, Pennsylvania, and raised in nearby Camp Hill, Pennsylvania, he attended the University of Pennsylvania. Upon earning a degree in accounting from the Wharton School there, he was commissioned a second lieutenant in the United States Army Reserve. He went on active duty before the United States entered World War II. Following World War II, he became a career officer and received a Regular Army (United States) commission. He retired from the army in 1973 with the rank of colonel. Following his retirement he lived in Tucson, Arizona.

When the Sanctuary movement started in the 1980s, he became a supporter and even helped to transport and house Central American political refugees.

In 1987 he joined Veterans for Peace, and was soon elected president of the organization's Tucson chapter. He later served as the national president of VFP. He also served as a member of the board of advisers for the Center for Defense Information.

Following a brief illness, he died from pancreatic cancer less than two months shy the 65th anniversary of his marriage to Lucille Burkholder. He frequently cited her as being his inspiration to study and take action on social justice issues following his retirement specifically noting that she had introduced him to both Sanctuary and VFP. She survived him by two years.
