= Sara Tea =

American musician (born 1978)

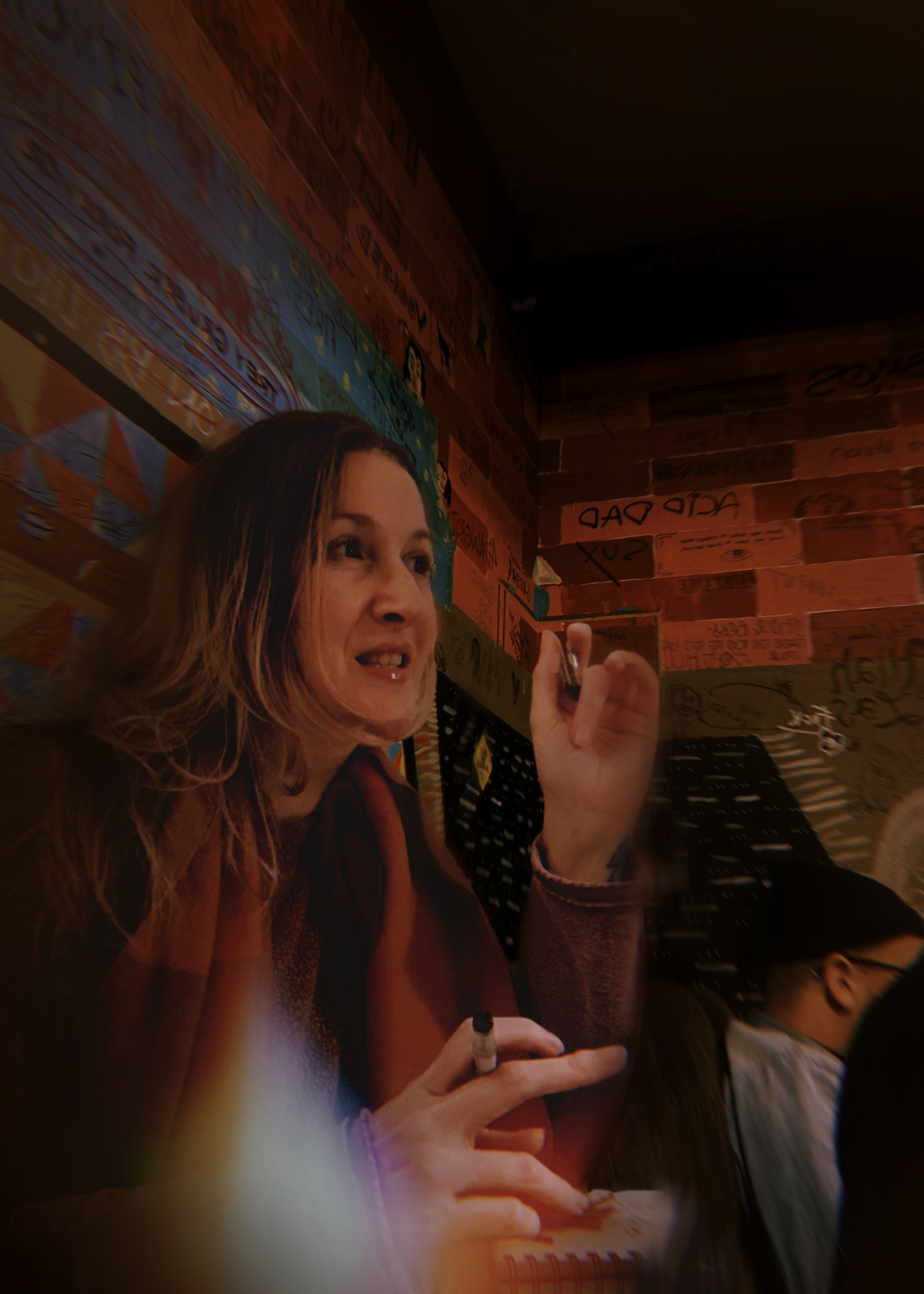
- Sara Tea backstage at The Empty Bottle Chicago

Background information
- Born: Sara Thurston; May 13, 1978 (age 47)
- Origin: Tucson, Arizona, U.S.
- Genres: Indie rock, folk rock, avant-rock, post punk, art rock, alternative rock
- Occupations: DJ, artist, musician, producer, business owner, cultural critic, podcast host
- Instruments: Drums, percussion, bass guitar, guitar, piano, vocals
- Years active: 1999–present
- Website: www.saratea.com

Sara Tea (born May 13, 1978) is an American musician, DJ, artist, and producer. She is best known for creating Danceotron, Denver, Colorado’s “No Bullshit Dance Party.”

Born Sara Thurston in Tucson, Arizona, her family moved to seven different states before settling in New Jersey for her high school years. She attended Princeton High School, which is known for its strong music and arts programs.

In 2015, she was diagnosed with postural orthostatic tachycardia syndrome, a form of dysautonomia. This caused her to have issues drumming and performing basic tasks, leading her to take a hiatus from 2017-2020. Her first solo EP Songs for Discarded Souls was released on January 13, 2023

== Career ==
=== DJ ===
After graduating from high school, she moved to Boulder, Colorado in 1996. She began working as a preschool teacher’s assistant and in video production until she landed 2 on-air radio positions in 1997 - KUCB (now popularly known as Radio 1190) and the online radio station gogaga.com, one of the first online radio stations in the country. Around this time, she got involved in Boulder’s rave scene and going to underground dance parties.

In 2000, she moved to Denver, Colorado. There, she got her first DJ residency at the Snake Pit.

In April 2002, she started "Denver's No Bullshit Dance Party,” Danceotron, at Hipster Youth Halfway House. "I put up rules like 'Leave your attitude at the door' to make it clear that this night was for dancing.”

“The reason I created Danceotron was because I wanted to remove the obstacles that made me frustrated to go out, which was dealing with obnoxious promoters and door staff—people who just didn’t want to connect. It gets more complicated when you add drugs and alcohol, and this whole idea of what it means to go out and dress up. So, I created an environment I desired. Anyone can do that; you can create the reality you desire.”

In 2004, she received awards from The Denver Post for Best Underground DJ and from Westword for Best Dance/Electronic DJ.

In 2006, she was named one of The Denver Post’s “Six DJs you ought to be dancing to” and was described as having an “electro-booty synth” style. She was praised for introducing audiences to new sounds and evolving to develop more than one style.

In 2007, she created the soundtrack of the play 1001, a postmodernist take on The Arabian Nights, at the Denver Center for the Performing Arts. Director Ethan McSweeny felt that they needed more than one artist’s take on the play, deciding that a DJ could provide a “cultural smash-up” of different genres, generations, and cultures. Sara was recommended by the sound designer due to her reputation with Danceotron.

In 2008, she moved to Los Angeles and in 2010, she was listed on LA Weekly’s “Top 5 Hottest L.A. Lady DJs.”

In 2011, she hosted a show on Indie 103 called NXT LVL, before moving to Chicago, Illinois later in the year.

In 2012, she joined the Chicago all-female Beastie Boys tribute band, She’s Crafty, as the group’s first DJ. They met at an all-women comedy showcase at the Book Cellar called The Kates. She remained in the band until 2013 when she moved to Florida.

In 2015, she moved back to Los Angeles and lived there until 2017, when she moved to Michigan. She took a 3 year hiatus due to her illness and played her first show in March 2020.

=== Musician ===
Sara first began playing the drums in 1999 after a mentor gifted her a drum set. She had tried several instruments throughout high school like guitar, keyboard, and cello, but none “clicked.” She took a month of drum lessons and two months later was playing shows. Around the same time, she began songwriting and producing.

In 2000, she was the drummer for the indie-pop band Clever Elsie.

She was the drummer for the band The Hot House from 2003 to 2005.

In 2007, she started a band called the Little Heads, now known as Clotheshorse.

From 2008 to 2009, she was the drummer for Josh Taylor’s Friends Forever.

In 2011, she was the drummer of the band The Hildegard Knef. She left the band later that year due to medical issues, which ended up being diagnosed as dysautonomia in 2015.

In 2020, she had planned on releasing her first solo EP titled Soft Revenge, but the COVID-19 pandemic delayed the release until 2021. The EP was originally going to be recorded at High Bias Records in Detroit with Chris Koltay (The War On Drugs, Akron/Family, Deerhunter), but due to the pandemic, Sara produced it herself throughout 2020. She was inspired to self-produce by a conversation with Heba Kadry.

Sara released her latest EP, Songs for Discarded Souls on January 13, 2023. The sound has been described as "indie-tronica...from the torch-songs-meets-hip-hop approach of Portishead, with a hint of Mazzy Star." The final mix was completed in the summer of 2022 and the first single off the EP was "Heaven Knows." The EP was mixed and mastered by Fred Thomas at Ravine Studios in Ann Arbor, Michigan. Of the EP, Sara stated, "Music shouldn’t be a luxury of the rich, healthy or young. I’m excited to keep building spaces online to just support each other in a world that sometimes makes it very difficult and pushes many of us to the edges of society. That’s why these are the songs for the discarded souls."

=== Podcast ===
In 2011, she began her podcast, Sara Tea Time. It has featured guests from comedian Aparna Nancherla to Broad City’s Ilana Glazer to Ben Roy. The focus of the podcast is interviewing creatives about “their world and how they manifest” and their creative process. As of January 2021, there have been 15 episodes of the podcast.

=== Other work ===
In 2002, Sara worked in the sound department on the movie The Next Industrial Revolution.

In 2004, Sara opened up a boutique shop called Chielle in Denver. At its original location, it served as a clothing shop, selling local literature and music and hosting occasional concerts. When they relocated, they started hosting performances by artists like K Records founder Calvin Johnson, Michael Hurley, and Dear Nora. In 2017, Chielle was listed on Westword’s “10 Bygone Alternative Spaces That Shaped Denver Underground Music.”

Sara is a mentor with the organization SoundGirls, whose mission is to give women and non-binary people a network within the audio and music production industries.

In December 2020, she was accepted into Giphy artists.
