= Hideout =

A Hideout usually refers to a secret location such as a retreat etc. The term may also refer to:

== Entertainment ==
=== Movies ===
- Hideout (film), a 1949 American thriller film directed by Philip Ford
- The Hideout (1956 film), a British crime film directed by Peter Graham Scott
- The Hideout (2007 film), an Italian-American film by Pupi Avati

=== Music ===
- Hideout (Film School album), 2008
- Hideout (Antenna album), 1993
- Hideout (Parcels EP), 2017
- Hideout Festival, an electronic music festival held in Zrce, Croatia

=== Novels ===
- Hideout (manga), a 2010 psychological horror manga by Kakizaki Masasumi
- Hideout (novel), a 2013 novel by Gordon Korman

== Places ==
- Hideout, Utah, a town in Wasatch County, Utah, United States
- The Hideout, Pennsylvania, a private community in Wayne County, Pennsylvania, United States
- The Hideout Golf Club, a public golf course in Monticello, Utah, United States
- The Hideout Inn, a bar and music venue in Chicago, Illinois, United States
