= Safe haven (disambiguation) =

A safe haven is a place of safety or refuge.

Safe haven or Safe Haven may also refer to:

- Sanctuary

== Arts and entertainment ==
- Safe Haven (novel), a 2010 American novel by Nicholas Sparks
  - Safe Haven (film), a 2013 American film adapted from the novel
- Safe Haven (short film), a 2009 American short film starring Daniela Ruah
- Safe Haven (album), a 2017 album by Canadian singer-songwriter Ruth B.
- "Safe Haven", a song by State Champs from the 2018 album Living Proof
- Safe Havens, a syndicated comic strip drawn by cartoonist Bill Holbrook
- Safehaven, an American television series by James Seale

== Other uses ==
- Safe haven games, also called bat-and-ball games
- Safe-haven currency, a currency believed to be a safe investment, especially in an unstable market
- Safe-haven law, for the decriminalization of leaving unharmed infants with statutorily designated private persons so that the child becomes a ward of the state
- Safe Haven Museum and Education Center, in Oswego, New York
- Civilian safe haven, may refer to a no-fly zone in a military conflict

== See also ==
- Safe harbor (disambiguation)
- Safe house
