= Stacey Richter =

American writer (born 1965)

- Born: April 3, 1965 (age 61); Prince George's County, Maryland
- Occupation: Fiction writer
- Writing career
- Subject: Fiction
- Website: staceyrichter.com

Stacey Richter is an American writer of short fiction. Richter has been the recipient of four Pushcart Prizes, a National Prize for Fiction and the National Magazine Award. Her first collection of stories, My Date with Satan, was published in 1999. In 2007, Richter published her second collection, Twin Study, which includes the Pushcart Award-winning story "The Land of Pain."

Richter was born in Prince George's County, Maryland on April 3, 1965, the daughter of Valerie and Herschel Richter, a cardiologist. She was raised in Phoenix, Arizona. Richter earned a Bachelor of Arts in History from the University of California, Berkeley and a Master's in Creative Writing from Brown University. She has lived in Tucson since 1992.

== Works ==
Story collections

- Twin Study, 2008, Counterpoint, pbk edition ISBN 978-1582433936; 2007 edition. ISBN 978-1582433714.
- My Date with Satan, 1999 ISBN 0684857014
