= Madeline Heineman Berger =

American activist

Madeline Dreyfuss Heineman Berger (born 1882, in Nevada City, California; died 1943, in La Jolla, California) was an American activist in support of music and the arts in Tucson, Arizona. During her three decades of leadership of the Saturday Morning Music Club, the organization grew to become a significant promoter of local classical musicians and children's musical education. Berger was instrumental in planning and fundraising for the foundation of the Temple of Music and Art in 1927, which became Tucson's premier concert venue, and survives today as the home of the Arizona Theatre Company. In February 2012, Berger was one of the 10 notable historic Tucsonians whose lives were reenacted on stage to commemorate the Arizona Centennial.

We are offering you this Temple, with its Spirit of Music, to be yours for all time; to enjoy, to care for, and cause to grow. Let its harmony spread from the few who are here to the many who are not here. Tonight it is young; into your kind hands and big hearts, we place it. Look then into the future and make it the Mecca of Art.

— Berger, 1907
