= John Fife =

U.S. minister and human rights activist

John Fife (born 1940) is a human rights activist and retired Presbyterian minister who lives in Tucson, Arizona. He was a member of the Sanctuary Movement and was a co-founder of the immigrant rights group No More Deaths.

Rev. Fife served as a minister for 35 years at Southside Presbyterian Church in Tucson, a church with a strong focus on social justice issues. In 1992 Fife was elected Moderator of the General Assembly of the Presbyterian Church (USA). He is now Pastor Emeritus at Southside Presbyterian.

In the 1980s John Fife and James A. Corbett co-founded the Sanctuary Movement in the United States. Volunteers in the movement provided support to Central American refugees, many of whom were fleeing U.S.-supported death squads in their home countries of El Salvador and Guatemala. The movement organized over 500 churches to help the refugees cross the border and find sanctuary in the U.S., in defiance of federal law. In 1986 Fife was convicted, along with seven other people, of violating federal immigration laws and served five years probation.

In 2004 a group of religious leaders in Tucson formed a coalition called No More Deaths to attempt to end the deaths of immigrants along the United States-Mexico border. John Fife was among the leaders of that effort and continues to work closely with No More Deaths.

Religious titles
Preceded by The Rev. Dr. Herbert D. Valentine	Moderator of the 204th General Assembly of the Presbyterian Church (USA); 1992–1993	Succeeded by The Rev. David Dobler
