= Leopoldo Carrillo =

American pioneer and entrepreneur (1836–1890)

- Leopoldo Carrillo, courtesy of the Arizona Historical Society
- Born: May 24, 1836; Moctezuma, Sonora
- Died: December 9, 1890 (aged 54); Tucson, Arizona
- Occupation: Entrepreneur
- Known for: Pioneer in Tucson
- Notable work: Carrillo's Gardens
- Political party: Republican
- Spouses: Jesusita Suarez, Elvira Suarez de Carrillo
- Children: 10
- Parent(s): Luis Carrillo, Dona Maria Martines

Don Leopoldo Carrillo (May 24, 1836 – December 9, 1890) was a Mexican-American entrepreneur and one of the earliest pioneers of Tucson, Arizona. He became a naturalized American citizen in 1873.

== Early years ==
Leopoldo Carrillo was born on May 24, 1836, in Moctezuma, Sonora (previously known as Oposura) as the illegitimate son of Luis Carrillo and Dona Maria Martines. Luis Carrillo was a Spanish soldier and Dona Maria Martines was half Opata. Leopoldo had two younger brothers, Francisco and Procopio, and an older sister named Teodosia. He had another relative named Emilio, but it is not known whether he was a brother or a cousin. The latter is likely as Leopoldo referred to him as "primo," the Spanish word for cousin.

Leopoldo Carrillo had no formal education, teaching himself how to read, write and speak Spanish and English. He had humble beginnings selling bottles on the streets to pay for his lessons. This would lead him to becoming a strong supporter of the establishment of Tucson School District #1.

== Personal life ==
Back row: Unknown, Unknown, Luis, Arturo, Matilde, Leopoldo Sr., Leopoldo Jr. Front Row: Unknown. Joaquin c. 1878

Jesusita Suarez, Leopoldo Carrillo's first wife

Leopoldo Carrillo married Jesusita Suarez on August 21, 1865, in Magdalena, Mexico. Jesusita's sister, Elvira Suarez de Carrillo, moved into the household. Along with hired servants, she helped to look after his large family of nine children.

After fifteen years of marriage, Jesusita died on June 28, 1880, at the age of 33. She had given birth to Mortimer Carrillo two days earlier, but the baby did not survive either. As it was improper for an unmarried woman to be living with a widower, Leopoldo married Elvira on September 6, 1880, who helped to raise his children who at the time were from ages two to thirteen.

Leopoldo's success as a businessman allowed for his children to live off most of his earnings. Carrillo was able to afford Leopoldo Jr.'s education at Santa Clara College in Berkeley, California. Leopoldo Jr. claimed that he did not need to work as a result of his father's success.

=== Gambling ===
Leopoldo Carrillo was very fond of gambling. Among the games he played were poker and Monte, the latter of which is a card game with origins in Spain. He reportedly won furniture such as a large mirror from these games, but he was very cautious about gambling debts. He would often put his property under his wife Jesusita's name to minimize his losses. One of his brothers, who owned the key to Leopoldo's safe, would not allow him to gamble if his losses were too great.

== Career ==
Leopoldo Carrillo had a very successful career as an entrepreneur. However, it was not without obstacles. The events of his career were contemporaneous to major civil conflicts such as the American Civil War and the Mexican Revolution. In addition to raids by Native Americans, Tucson and the surrounding area was particularly unstable.

=== As a freighter operator ===
In 1859, Carrillo ventured to the town of Tucson, Arizona which at the time was a government outpost on the verge of exponential growth. As a visionary, he saw the potential for the town's growth via mass transit and was key to getting the railroad through Tucson. Owning a farm near Fort Lowell, he was one of the first members of the Arizona Pioneer Society. As an entrepreneur, he set about to establish numerous facilities in Tucson. His experience as a freighter during the American Civil War and as a supporter of the Union gave him national recognition leading to his sudden rise in success. The freight business extended all the way from Sonora to Tucson and to St. Louis, Missouri. From there, goods were exported all the way to China and other Asian countries.

=== Livestock raiding ===
In 1869, a raiding party of Native Americans stole from Carrillo's cattle by herding them away from his ranch near San Xavier. Leopoldo retaliated by amassing a large group of approximately 50 bronco horses. He led them to recapture the entirety of his missing livestock in addition to capturing four horses from the Native Americans.

=== Kidnapping ===
During August 1875, Leopoldo was accused of providing guns to Mexican revolutionists despite him being in Canoa, Arizona at the time. Several days later, he was captured by a Mexican rebel named Don Jose Maria Escalante in an effort to obtain his money. A community effort was made to raise enough money to pay the ransom, but Escalante raised the amount from $5,000 to $7,000 in addition to all of Carrillo's cattle from his hacienda. Even after delivering the money, Escalante still threatened to kill Carrillo anyway.

Though Leopoldo prepared a plan for his family to recover his corpse should the ransom deal fail, he managed to escape on his own. He fled to the mountains disguising himself as a Native American through his dark skin and knowledge of the Opata language. After Carrillo escaped, a friend of his named Juan Bojorquez provided him with a horse to allow him to return to Tucson. They reunited with Jesusita who was accompanied by five other men armed with rifles. After this event, Leopoldo never celebrated the Mexican Independence Day again.

After Carrillo's kidnapping, the Arizona Citizen brought attention to the national level with a series of recollections about the event. They accused the government of Sonora of conspiracy and corruption holding them responsible for the attempt on Carrillo's life and the theft of $20,000 (equivalent to $586,364 in 2025).

Jesusita Suarez was instrumental in raising enough money to pay the ransom

=== As a property manager ===
Leopoldo Carrillo built numerous establishments in Tucson. By 1881, he had owned more than 100 buildings. Among them included a ten pin bowling alley and a piano parlor used by the Tucson Glee Club. He also commissioned the construction of the city's first two-story building, and built the town's first ice cream parlor which was unique in that it also served wine with it. He published music and was a musician himself.

=== Carrillo's Gardens ===
Perhaps his largest project was known as Carrillo's Gardens located just southwest of the main Tucson area. Built in 1885, it became the city's first free public park. Across eight acres, a variety of different fruit trees were planted, and numerous artificial lakes and ponds were constructed. These bodies of water were host to bathhouses and boat rides. The large presence of spring water which is scarce elsewhere in Arizona made the area very popular to the public. The park became home to many activities and facilities from restaurants to a menagerie. The park was also home to the private school known as Carrillo School. Though Carrillo's Gardens no longer exists, the land is used today by the Carrillo Intermediate Magnet School.

== Political beliefs ==
Leopoldo Carrillo strongly associated himself with capitalism. As the founder of the Mexican Republican Party in Arizona, Carrillo was very active in politics. He was a strong supporter of the Union during the American Civil War, and closely followed the career of John C. Frémont, the first Republican candidate for president. He also supported Abraham Lincoln's campaign for presidency and the abolitionist movement. Leopoldo Carrillo was often a featured speaker at most Republican party rallies.

While no evidence has been found, it is possible Leopoldo Carrillo served in the Union forces as at the time, Arizona was considered a part of the New Mexico territory. He would have served with the New Mexico regiments.

== Death ==
Carrillo died of tuberculosis at 2 am in his home at age 54 on December 9, 1890, in Pima County in Tucson, Arizona. The Arizona Pioneer Society conducted his funeral at the Holy Hope Cemetery and Mausoleum while praising him for his accomplishments. Carrillo had over 300 descendants. many to this day still living in Tucson.

== Legacy ==
Leopoldo Carrillo was well regarded for his honest gentlemanly demeanor. As one of the first major developers of Tucson, he was widely praised for his work for the community. After 87 years, the Carrillo homestead was converted into a museum in 1972 which remains open to the public to this day.

The Arizona Citizen described Carrillo's horse stable the best in Arizona. The Arizona Daily Star described him as someone always building and renovating. On October 16, 1977, they published an article to invite locals to join in a gathering to commemorate the Carrillo family.

The Arizona Historical Society keeps thoroughly documented records of letters, articles and photographs related to the Carrillo family which are available for public viewing.

== Paranormal activity ==
Visitors to the Carrillo household have reported sightings of paranormal entities. These include happy teenage girls in the Sosa Bedroom, a woman in the large pier mirror in the zaguan (foyer), and a woman in pain, crying and clutching her stomach. The latter is believed to be Leopoldo's second wife Elvira Suarez de Carrillo who died of stomach cancer. These paranormal events have drawn interest to the museum as it is regarded that the Carrillo family and their relatives benevolently enjoy themselves in the presence of visitors to their home.

== See also ==
- Sosa–Carrillo–Fremont House

== Bibliography ==
- Auslander, Edith Sayre (October 16, 1977). "Pioneer Family: 'Pachanga' will pay tribute to Carrillos". Arizona Daily Star.
- Richards, Bette Bunker (2005). Don Leopoldo Carrillo: Tucson Pioneer.
- Scrivner, A.V. (2006). Valiant Southwest. Tucson, AZ: Gala Text. ISBN 1887116133.
