= American Baptist Churches v. Thornburgh =

American Baptist Churches v. Thornburgh 760 F. Supp. 796 (N.D. Cal. 1991), formerly American Baptist Churches v Meese, was a class action lawsuit against the Immigration and Naturalization Service (INS), the Executive Office for Immigration Review (EOIR), and the Department of State. (DOS). The suit was filed in 1985 by a coalition of religious organizations, refugee legal assistance organizations, and numerous human rights organizations, including the American Civil Liberties Union (ACLU), the Center for Constitutional Rights (CCR), and the National Lawyers Guild.(NLG) Although the case originally stated two different groups of plaintiffs, various religious organizations involved in the Sanctuary movement and Central American refugees, after changes were made to criminal laws formerly used to prosecute these religious organizations, the focus of the suit was centered more specifically to claims of discrimination against Central American refugees in asylum seeking processes. This, they argued, was in direct violation of the tenets of the Refugee Act of 1980, which sought to create uniform criteria by which to review cases in which individuals fleeing political persecution and humanitarian crises would become eligible for asylum. After five years, the government settled the case, granting temporary protected status for many Salvadoran and Guatemalan immigrants and providing them with among other things, de novo asylum interviews, stays from deportation and work authorization.

== Plaintiffs ==
=== Central American migrants ===
In 1985, when the suit was originally filed, there was and had been for some time, considerable violence in Central America. For both Guatemala and El Salvador, this meant two civil wars that together, reached an estimated 275,000 deaths; 200,000 in Guatemala, and 75,000 in El Salvador. Although this spanned thirty six years for Guatemala, with the beginning of the Guatemalan Civil War in 1960, the period of the greatest violence for Guatemala began in the 1980s, under the leadership of figures like Efrain Rios Montt. This period was also one of intense violence in El Salvador, with the Salvadoran Civil War officially beginning in 1980 and ending in 1992. Both countries, experiencing stark poverty and political repression, similarly experienced the use of militarily trained “death squads”, forced disappearances, the formation of guerrilla resistance movements, and massacres such as El Mozote in El Salvador and the genocide of indigenous Mayans in Guatemala. Under these conditions, there was a spike in migration from Central America to the United States, notably from El Salvador and Guatemala, which had not previously experienced large-scale migration to the United States.

=== Religious organizations ===
It was in this context, coupled with the absence of protections afforded to refugees by asylum, that religious organizations began not only to provide services for migrants already living in the United States, but also, helping to transport refugees still in Central America to the United States through Mexico. Defending these actions by contending that the individuals they had assisted were indeed, refugees, albeit unlawfully denied those protections, some in the movement were nonetheless prosecuted for their actions by the INS. This would lead to the beginning of the settlement, with various religious, legal, and community activist, organizations filing against the INS for the violation of rights of the religious organizations and the migrants themselves.

== Context and evidence ==
=== Disproportionate approval rates and discrimination ===
Despite the violence in Central America, there were not many approved cases for asylum in the United States for either Guatemalan or Salvadoran migrants. The INS Fiscal Year statistics for 1984 report for example, a 3 percent approval rate for Salvadoran migrants and a one percent of less approval rate for Guatemalan migrants the same year. This was in stark contrast to a much higher rates of around thirty percent or higher. This would become a particularly important issue in the suit, addressing among other issues, what they believed was a systemic discrimination against Central American applicants.

=== Refugee Act of 1980 ===
Directly related to the issue of discrimination was the recent passage of the Refugee Act of 1980, an amendment to the Immigration and Nationality Act and the Migration and Refugee Assistance Act that was introduced to the Senate by Senator Ted Kennedy and signed by President Jimmy Carter. Among other goals, the stated purpose of the amendment was to address the needs of people who had faced persecution in their origin countries, and to provide them with assistance and opportunities to facilitate resettlement when needed and possible. In doing so, there was a great focus on humanitarian efforts to absorb refugees already present in the United States, whereas much of the focus before hand had been with concentrating refugee policy outside of the United States. Building on this precedent, and in some ways, testing its strength, the settlement would use the arguments made in the Refugee Act to argue that the INS had violated the goals of providing vulnerable communities that fit the definition of refugee with the protections of asylum.

=== Orantes-Hernandez v Smith ===
Within the issue of low rates of granted asylum was also recent history of abuses against Salvadoran migrants by INS, as addressed in the case of Orantes-Hernandez v Smith. Among these abuses was the detention of Salvadoran migrants without informing them of their rights to apply for asylum, as well as pressuring them to sign papers for their voluntary departure, many times when the migrants did not understand what they were signing. Other instances also involved excessive force, providing false information, and threatening detainees who refused to sign with punishment. This became important evidence to the arguments of discrimination, strengthening the case of the plaintiffs against the existing failures of INS.

== Settlement ==
After five years, a settlement was finally reached between the plaintiffs and for the most part, INS. Reasons for this were likely that litigation over the five years had been very expensive and that continuing on to a trial would have been even more expensive. The plaintiffs had also collected a substantial amount of evidence, and had what seemed to a very strong case against INS. Ultimately, the plaintiffs were able to secure de novo adjudication for many Guatemalan and Salvadoran migrants, who while they waited for new interviews, were also granted a stay from deportation and work authorization. Those who did not meet the period of arrival or had committed an aggravated felony however, were barred from receiving asylum and settlement benefits.

=== Eligible for settlement benefits ===
Guatemalan Migrants

- Had to have entered into the United States on or before October 1, 1990.
- Had to register on or before December 1, 1991.
- Had to apply on or before January 3, 1995.

Salvadoran Migrants

- Had to have entered into the United States on or before September 19, 1990.
- Had to register on or before October 31, 1991.
- Had to apply on or before February 16, 1996.

=== Settlement benefits ===
==== De novo asylum interviews ====
Previous decisions made about migrants who were eligible for the agreement benefits were disregarded, and if a denial for asylum was recommended to the Bureau of Human Rights and Humanitarian Affairs (BHRHA), INS would have to put forth specific reasons as to why.

==== Stays from deportation ====
Most applicants would be protected from deportation with exception of individuals who had committed a crime of moral turpitude, which carried a sentence of at least 6 months, posed a national security risk, or was deemed a threat to public safety.

==== Work authorization ====
All applicants who met the requirements, as far as eligibility to receive settlement benefits, were eligible for work authorization as one of those benefits.
