= Peter N. Peregrine =

American anthropologist

Peter Neal Peregrine
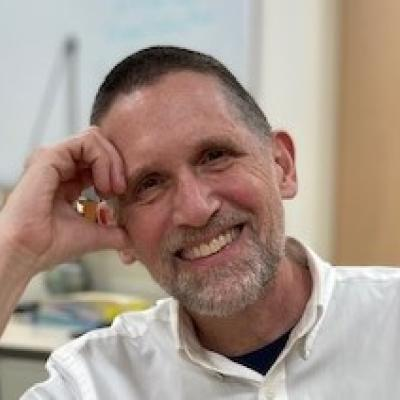
- Peter N. Peregrine
- Born: November 29, 1963 (age 62)
- Citizenship: American
- Education: Purdue University (PhD 1990)
- Known for: North American archaeology quantitative analysis of cultural evolution cross-cultural research scientific anthropology
- Awards: Fellow, American Association for the Advancement of Science
- Scientific career
- Fields: Anthropology, archaeology
- Workplaces: Lawrence University, Wisconsin USA; Human Relations Area Files at Yale University; Santa Fe Institute, Santa Fe, NM.
- Academic advisors: Richard Blanton

Peter N. Peregrine (born November 29, 1963) is an American anthropologist, registered professional archaeologist, and academic. He is well known for his promotion of the use of science in anthropology, and for his popular textbook Anthropology (with Carol R. Ember and Melvin Ember). Peregrine did dissertation research on the evolution of the Mississippian culture of North America, and conducted fieldwork on Bronze Age cities in Syria. He is emeriti Professor of Anthropology and Museum Studies at Lawrence University and Research Associate of the Human Relations Area Files at Yale University. From 2012 to 2018 he was an External Professor at the Santa Fe Institute.

Peregrine developed a comprehensive data set and methodology for conducting diachronic cross-cultural research. He used this to write the Atlas of Cultural Evolution and, with Melvin Ember, the Encyclopedia of Prehistory. He developed the organizational structure for the Human Relations Area Files (eHRAF) Archaeology.

Peregrine conducted archaeological fieldwork in North America, Syria, and South America. Much of his fieldwork involved the use of geophysical techniques to identify buried archaeological deposits. In 2009 Peregrine started the Lawrence University Archaeological Survey, which focused on using geophysical techniques to locate unmarked graves in early Wisconsin cemeteries.

In 2011 Peregrine was elected a Fellow of the American Association for the Advancement of Science.

In 2024 Peregrine was ordained a deacon in the Evangelical Lutheran Church in America and currently works as a health care chaplain in the East Central Synod of Wisconsin.

== Contributions to North American archaeology ==
Peregrine published extensively on the Mississippian culture that affected numerous peoples in North America, and on archaeological method and theory. Peregrine argued that Mississippian cultures should be seen as participants in a large system that integrated much of eastern North America in a single political economy. He initially employed world-systems theory to do this, arguing that large centers were cores of political and economic authority, which were supported by peripheral regions though the exchange of objects used in rituals of social reproduction, such as initiation and marriage. The Mississippian cores themselves competitively manufactured and traded these objects, linking them into what Peregrine called a prestige-goods system. Polities vied for power over exchange, and rose and fell as their ability to control prestige-goods strengthened or waned. The response to Peregrine’s view was mixed, with some calling it “exaggerationalist” and others adopting it into their own work.

In the mid-1990s Peregrine and colleagues Richard Blanton, Gary M. Feinman, and Steven Kowalewski developed “dual-processual” theory in studying Mesoamerican civilization. Peregrine also applied this theory to Mississippian polities.

Dual-processual theory posits that political leaders adopt strategies for implementing power ranging along a continuum from being highly exclusionary to highly inclusive. Exclusionary (or network) strategies are like those, which Peregrine said, were in place among Mississippian polities. Peregrine argued that inclusive (or corporate) ones were in place among some Ancestral Puebloan polities. While not without controversy, dual processual theory has come to be seen as a valuable tool for understanding both Mississippian and Ancestral Puebloan polities.

In the early 2010s Peregrine and colleague Steven Lekson argued that the Mississippian and Ancestral Puebloan worlds should be viewed as linked together, along with Early Postclassic Mesoamerica, in a continent-wide “oikoumene”. They argue that only such a continental perspective can allow archaeologists to understand broad processes of coordinated change, such as the emergence of urban-like communities in many parts of North America around 900 CE. Again, though not without controversy, Peregrine’s multi-regional perspective has been seen as useful for addressing some questions in North American archaeology.

== Contributions to cross-cultural studies ==
In addition to archaeology Peregrine also made a number of contributions to cross-cultural studies. The focus of his work was on developing archaeological correlates for various types of behavior, including warfare, postmarital residence, and social stratification. Peregrine also developed new methodologies for conducting diachronic cross-cultural research using archaeological cases. In the late 2010s Peregrine used diachronic cross-cultural research to explore how ancient societies were able to successfully build resilience to climate-related disasters. He argued that this work could help modern societies to create policies to enhance resilience to the increasing frequency of climate-related disasters caused by climate change.
