= Melvin Ember =

American anthropologist (1933–2009)

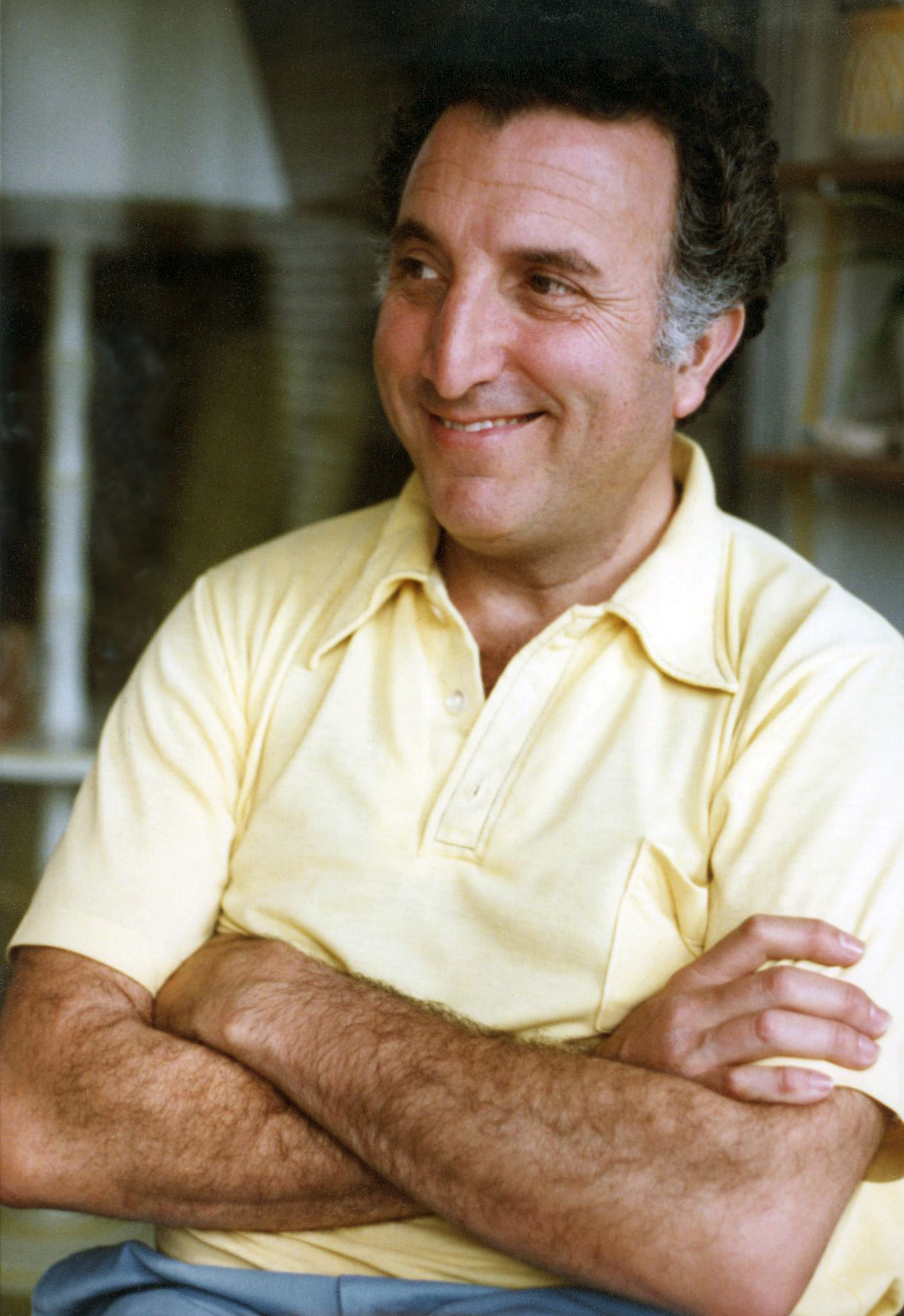
- Mel Ember, ca. 1990
- Born: January 13, 1933; Brooklyn, NY
- Died: September 27, 2009 (aged 76); New Haven, CT
- Citizenship: American
- Education: Yale University
- Known for: cross-cultural research kinship studies scientific anthropology
- Awards: Fellow, American Association for the Advancement of Science
- Scientific career
- Fields: anthropology, ethnology, cross-cultural studies
- Workplaces: City University of New York, Human Relations Area Files
- Academic advisors: George Peter Murdock

Melvin Lawrence Ember (January 13, 1933 – September 27, 2009) was an American cultural anthropologist and cross-cultural researcher with wide-ranging interests who combined an active research career with writing for nonprofessionals.

== Biography ==
Drawn to anthropology after reading the works of Margaret Mead, he attended Columbia University at the young age of 16 where he was further inspired by Elman Service and Morton Fried in the anthropology department (B.A. 1953). He then went on to Yale University to study for his Ph.D. in anthropology (received 1958), primarily under the mentorship of George Peter Murdock.

After a year's postdoctoral work at Yale, Ember spent four years at the Laboratory of Socio-Environmental Studies at the National Institute of Health (1959–62). He was professor at Antioch College (1963–67) and Hunter College (1967–87). He also chaired the department of anthropology at Hunter College of the City University of New York (1967–73). Here he succeeded in expanding the department significantly, attracting young scholars from major institutions. He also served as executive officer of the City University of New York graduate program in anthropology from 1973 to 1975.

He was president of the Society for Cross-Cultural Research in 1981–82 and in 1982 took over the editorship of Cross-Cultural Research, a position he held until the time of his death. He moved to the New Haven area in 1987 to become president of the Human Relations Area Files (HRAF), an institution at Yale whose mission is to foster the comparative study of culture. Under his leadership, he helped revitalize the institution, moving its databases into the digital age.

== Work ==
=== Fieldwork ===
In contrast to most cultural anthropologists at the time, who conducted their fieldwork in a single community, Ember's fieldwork in American Samoa was explicitly comparative, using community variation to test theories about culture change. He chose three communities differing in distance from the commercial center to evaluate how commercial involvement affected political change.

His assessment of Samoan kinship was subsequently challenged by Derek Freeman, long before the now-famous Mead–Freeman controversy about Samoa. Because Ember knew, from his cross-community comparisons, that there was substantial variation within American Samoa, he questioned how Freeman, working in a very different time and in Western Samoa, could doubt Mead's veracity.

=== National Institute of Mental Health ===
At the National Institute of Mental Health Embler worked on the universality of the familial incest taboo. Since all societies prohibit familial incest, he decided to focus on cross-cultural variation in cousin marriage to try to understand why some societies allowed close cousin marriages while others forbade it.

After evaluating the various explanatory hypotheses of the time, his own empirical research confirmed that much of the variation in cousin marriage could best be explained as an adaptation to the harmful effects of inbreeding.

=== Cross-cultural work ===
As a professor at Antioch College and Hunter College Ember continued his cross-cultural work on aspects of kinship and social organization, picking up first on topics that Murdock was unable to explain, such as variation in post-marital residence and unilineal descent. Traditional theories had focused on economic factors, such as which gender contributed most to the economy, but finding these explanations lacking in predictive value, Ember began to explore other possibilities, particularly the effects of warfare in the social environment.

Because warfare seemed so central in explaining various aspects of social organization, he then turned to research that tested ideas about why societies varied in type and frequency of violence, looking at variation in warfare frequency, homicide, and corporal punishment of children in the anthropological record. Believing that laws about human nature should hold true among technological complex as well as simpler societies, he persuaded political scientist Bruce Russett to join him and his wife Carol R. Ember in a project to test the theory that “democracies do not fight each other”.

Although the concepts of democracy and international war had to be transformed to fit the anthropological record, the results of their collaborative research were consistent with many studies conducted by political scientists. Ember later worked with cross-cultural psychologists to explore the relationships between aggression and war.

=== Interdisciplinary research ===
Branching out into diverse and interdisciplinary research areas was not unusual for Ember. Indeed, he published scholarly articles in archaeology, linguistics, biological anthropology, and even ethology. He fervently believed that the work of different anthropologists in far-flung places and across time could be used to test theories about why cultures varied or were similar and he devoted most of his research career to systematically testing explanations, rather than just expounding them.

His passion for systematic comparative research on challenging questions in all areas of anthropology influenced a generation of younger scholars through his direction of the first Summer Institute for Cross-Cultural Research in 1964, his active participation in NSF-funded Summer Institutes in Comparative Research between 1991 and 1999, and through the series of publications in comparative methods that resulted from these Institutes.

=== Publications ===
Ember is widely known as the co-author of two major textbooks, Anthropology (with Carol R. Ember and Peter N. Peregrine, Prentice-Hall), and Cultural Anthropology (with Carol R. Ember, Prentice-Hall), first published in 1973 and now in their 13th edition (2011). He was also editor or co-editor of eight encyclopedias.
