= Monogamy =

Form of dyadic relationship

Monogamy (/məˈnɒɡəmi/ mə-NOG-ə-mee) is a relationship of two individuals in which they form a mutual and exclusive intimate partnership. Having only one partner at any one time, whether for life or serial monogamy, contrasts with various forms of non-monogamy (e.g., polygamy or polyamory).

The term monogamy, derived from Greek for "one marriage", has multiple context-dependent meanings—genetic, sexual, social, and marital—each varying in interpretation across cultures and disciplines, making its definition complex and often debated. The term is typically used to describe the behavioral ecology and sexual selection of animal mating systems, referring to the state of having only one mate at any one given time. In a human cultural context, monogamy typically refers to the custom of two individuals, regardless of orientation, committing to a sexually exclusive relationship.

Monogamy in humans varies widely across cultures and definitions. A minority of societies are strictly monogamous, while many others practice serial monogamy or tolerate extramarital sex. Genetic monogamy is relatively unstudied and often contradicted by evidence of extrapair paternity. Monogamy in humans likely evolved through a combination of biological factors such as the need for paternal care and ecological pressures, alongside cultural developments like agriculture, property inheritance, and religious or societal norms promoting social stability.

Biologists distinguish between social, sexual, and genetic monogamy to reflect how animal pairings may involve cohabitation, sexual exclusivity, and reproductive fidelity in varying combinations, while serial monogamy describes successive exclusive relationships over time.

== Terminology ==
The word monogamy derives from the Greek μονός, monos ("one"), and γάμος, gamos ("marriage"), referring to the functional social behaviour of pair-bonding. The term can then be subsequently subclassified by context-dependent relational types. Generally, there are four intersecting definitions.

- genetic monogamy refers to sexually monogamous relationships with genetic evidence of paternity.
- sexual monogamy refers to two partners remaining sexually exclusive with each other and having no outside sex partners.
- social monogamy refers to two individuals co-habitating, maintaining a sexual relationship, and sharing basic resources such as shelter, food, and parenting responsibilities.
- marital monogamy refers to marriages of only two people, within the context of the institution of marriage.

For instance, biologists, biological anthropologists, and behavioral ecologists often use monogamy in the sense of sexual, if not genetic (reproductive), exclusivity. When cultural or social anthropologists and other social scientists use the term monogamy, the meaning is social or marital monogamy.

Marital monogamy may be further distinguished between:

1. classical monogamy, "a single relationship between people who marry as virgins, remain sexually exclusive their entire lives, and become celibate upon the death of the partner"
2. serial monogamy, marriage with only one other person at a time, in contrast to bigamy or polygamy

Defining monogamy across cultures can be difficult because of different cultural assumptions. Some societies believe that monogamy requires limiting sexual activity to a single partner for life. Others accept or endorse pre-marital sex prior to marriage. Some societies consider sex outside of marriage or "spouse swapping" to be socially acceptable. Some consider a relationship monogamous even if partners separate and move to a new monogamous relationship through death, divorce, or simple dissolution of the relationship, regardless of the length of the relationship (serial monogamy). The need to accurately define monogamy was highlighted in a 2012 work, which defined practices as either formal or informal polyandry. The researchers found 53 communities studied between 1912 and 2010 that practiced polyandry (in which women have multiple male partners). This broader definition indicated that polyandry was more common worldwide than previously believed.

Terminology may also affect how data on polygamy is interpreted. While the genetic record indicates that genetic monogamy increased within the last 5,000–10,000 years, the form of prehistoric non-monogamy is less clear. A lack of genetic monogamy could be interpreted as polygamy despite other plausible explanations. Anthropological observations indicate that even when polygyny is accepted in the community, the majority of relationships in the society are monogamous in practice – while couples remain in the relationship, which may not be lifelong. Thus, in prehistoric communities and communities categorized as polygamous, short- or long-term serial monogamy may be the most common practice rather than a lifelong monogamous bond.

== Frequency in humans ==
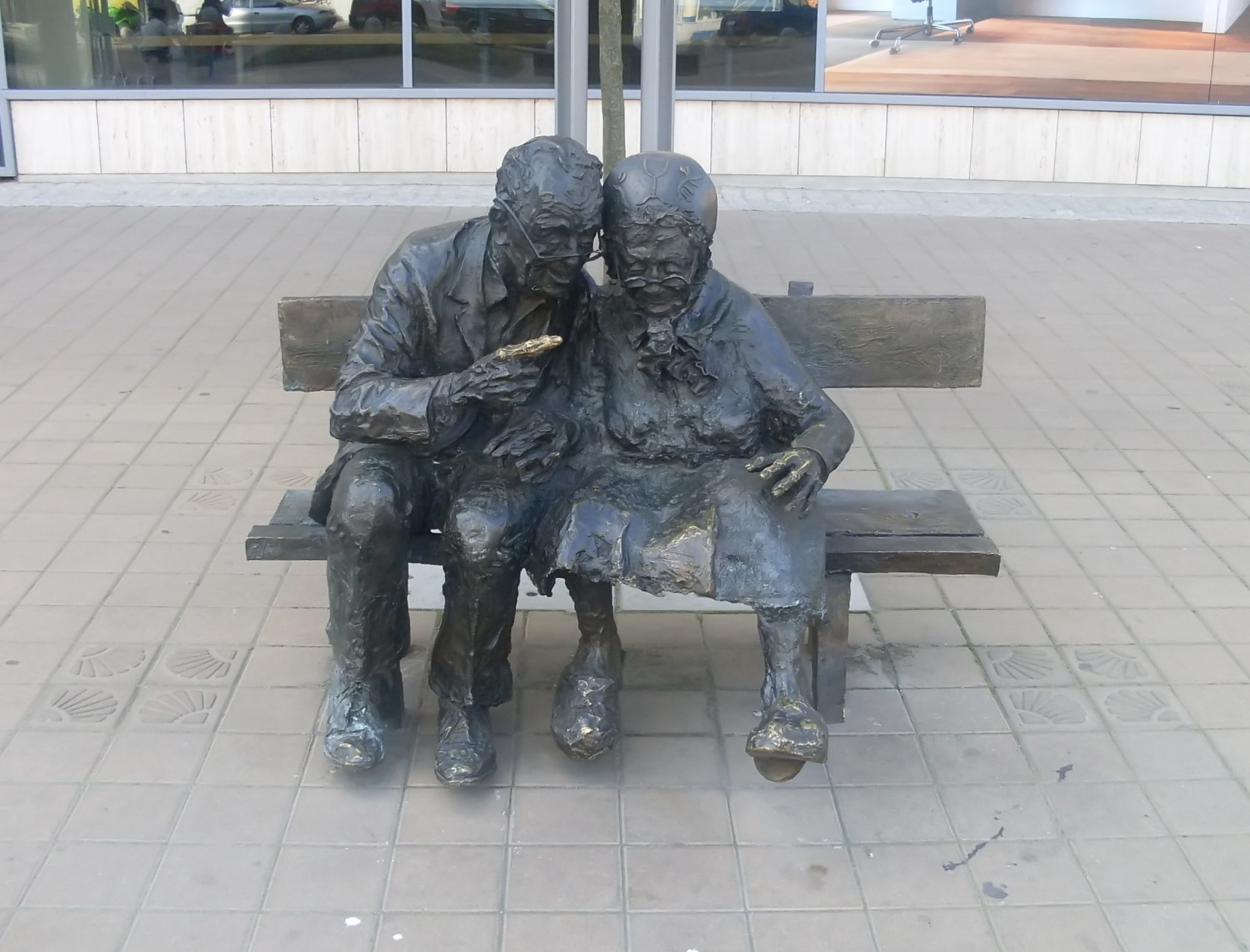
Bronze sculpture of an elderly Kashubian married couple located in Kaszubski square, Gdynia, Poland, which commemorates their monogamous fidelity, through the time of their separation, while he temporarily worked in the United States

=== Social monogamy ===
According to the Ethnographic Atlas by George P. Murdock, of 1,231 societies from around the world noted, 186 were monogamous; 453 had occasional polygyny; 588 had more frequent polygyny; and 4 had polyandry. (This does not take into account the relative population of each of the societies studied; the actual practice of polygamy in a tolerant society may actually be low, with the majority of aspirant polygamists practicing de facto monogamous marriage.)

Divorce and remarriage can result in "serial monogamy", i.e. multiple marriages but only one legal spouse at a time. This can be interpreted as a form of plural mating, as are those societies dominated by female-headed families in the Caribbean, Mauritius and Brazil where there is frequent rotation of unmarried partners. In all, these account for 16 to 24% of the "monogamous" category.

=== Sexual monogamy ===
The prevalence of sexual monogamy can be roughly estimated as the percentage of married people who do not engage in extramarital sex. The Standard Cross-Cultural Sample describes the amount of extramarital sex by men and women in over 50 pre-industrial cultures. The amount of extramarital sex by men is described as "universal" in 6 cultures, "moderate" in 29 cultures, "occasional" in 6 cultures, and "uncommon" in 10 cultures. The amount of extramarital sex by women is described as "universal" in 6 cultures, "moderate" in 23 cultures, "occasional" in 9 cultures, and "uncommon" in 15 cultures.

Surveys conducted in non-Western nations (2001) also found cultural and gender differences in extramarital sex. A study of sexual behavior in Thailand, Tanzania and Ivory Coast suggests about 16–34% of men engage in extramarital sex while a much smaller (unreported) percentage of women engage in extramarital sex. Studies in Nigeria have found around 47–53% of men and to 18–36% of women engage in extramarital sex. A 1999 survey of married and cohabiting couples in Zimbabwe reports that 38% of men and 13% of women engaged in extra-couple sexual relationships within the last 12 months.

Many surveys asking about extramarital sex in the United States have relied on convenience samples: surveys given to whoever happens to be easily available (e.g., volunteer college students or volunteer magazine readers). Convenience samples may not accurately reflect the population of the United States as a whole, which can cause serious biases in survey results. Sampling bias may, therefore, be why early surveys of extramarital sex in the United States have produced widely differing results: such early studies using convenience samples (1974, 1983, 1993) reported the wide ranges of 12–26% of married women and 15–43% of married men engaged in extramarital sex. Three studies have used nationally representative samples. These studies in 1994 and 1997 found that about 10–15% of women and 20–25% of men engage in extramarital sex.

Research by Colleen Hoffon of 566 homosexual male couples from the San Francisco Bay Area (2010) found that 45% had monogamous relationships. However, the Human Rights Campaign has stated, based on a Rockway Institute report, that "LGBT young people ... want to spend their adult life in a long-term relationship raising children." Specifically, over 80% of the homosexuals surveyed expected to be in a monogamous relationship after age 30.

=== Genetic monogamy ===
The incidence of genetic monogamy may be estimated from rates of extrapair paternity. Extrapair paternity is when offspring raised by a monogamous pair come from the female mating with another male. Rates of extrapair paternity have not been extensively studied in people. Many reports of extrapair paternity are little more than quotes based on hearsay, anecdotes, and unpublished findings. Simmons, Firman, Rhodes, and Peters reviewed 11 published studies of extra-pair paternity from various locations in the United States, France, Switzerland, the United Kingdom, Mexico, and among the native Yanomami Indians of Amazon forest in South America. The rates of extrapair paternity ranged from 0.03% to 11.8% although most of the locations had low percentages of extrapair paternity. The median rate of extrapair paternity was 1.8%. A separate review of 17 studies by Bellis, Hughes, Hughes, and Ashton found slightly higher rates of extrapair paternity. The rates varied from 0.8% to 30% in these studies, with a median rate of 3.7% extrapair paternity. A range of 1.8% to 3.7% extrapair paternity implies a range of 96% to 98% genetic monogamy. Although the incidence of genetic monogamy may vary from 70% to 99% in different cultures or social environments, a large percentage of couples remain genetically monogamous during their relationships. A review paper, surveying 67 other studies, reported rates of extrapair paternity, in different societies, ranging from 0.4% to over 50%.

Covert illegitimacy is a situation which arises when someone who is presumed to be a child's father (or mother) is in fact not the biological father (or mother). Frequencies as high as 30% are sometimes assumed in the media, but research by sociologist Michael Gilding traced these overestimates back to an informal remark at a 1972 conference.

The detection of unsuspected illegitimacy can occur in the context of medical genetic screening, in genetic family name research, and in immigration testing. Such studies show that covert illegitimacy is in fact less than 10% among the sampled African populations, less than 5% among the sampled Native American and Polynesian populations, less than 2% of the sampled Middle Eastern population, and generally 1–2% among European samples.

Pedigree errors are a well-known source of error in medical studies. When attempts are made to try to study medical afflictions and their genetic components, it becomes very important to understand non-paternity rates and pedigree errors. There are numerous software packages and procedures that exist for correcting research data for pedigree errors.

== Evolutionary and historical development in humans ==
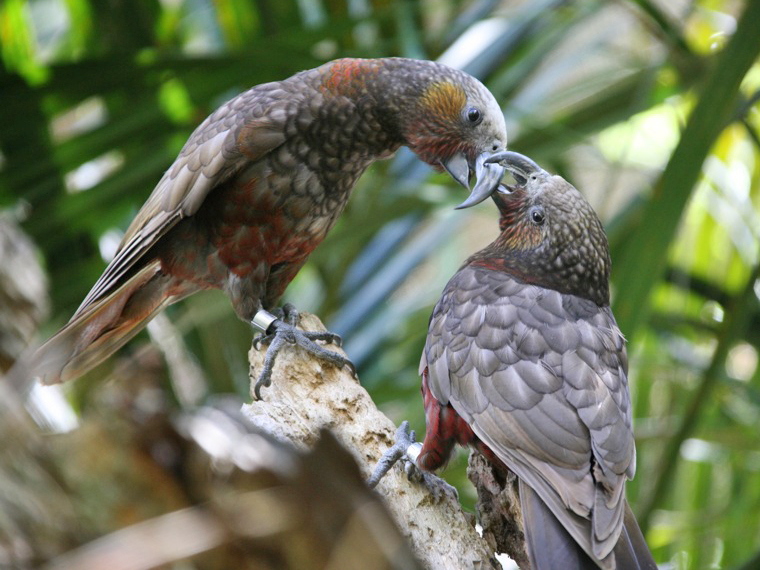
A pair of kākā parrots at Auckland Zoo

=== Biological arguments ===
Monogamy exists in many societies around the world, resulting in extensive scientific research which tries to understand how these marriage systems might have evolved. In any species, there are three main aspects that combine to promote a monogamous mating system: paternal care, resource access, and mate choice; however, in humans, the main theoretical sources of monogamy are paternal care and extreme ecological stresses. Paternal care should be particularly important in humans due to the extra nutritional requirement of having larger brains and the lengthier developmental period. Therefore, the evolution of monogamy could be a reflection of this increased need for bi-parental care. Similarly, monogamy should evolve in areas of ecological stress because male reproductive success should be higher if their resources are focused on ensuring offspring survival rather than searching for other mates. Due to the extreme sociality and increased intelligence of humans, Homo sapiens have solved many problems that generally lead to monogamy, such as those mentioned above. For example, monogamy is certainly correlated with paternal care, as shown by Marlowe, but not caused by it because humans diminish the need for bi-parental care through the aid of siblings and other family members in rearing the offspring. Furthermore, human intelligence and material culture allows for better adaptation to different and rougher ecological areas, thus reducing the causation and even correlation of monogamous marriage and extreme climates. However, some scientists argue that monogamy evolved by reducing within-group conflict, thus giving certain groups a competitive advantage against less monogamous groups.

Paleoanthropology and genetic studies offer two perspectives on when monogamy evolved in the human species: paleoanthropologists offer tentative evidence that monogamy may have started very early in human history whereas genetic studies suggest that monogamy might have increased much more recently, less than 10,000 to 20,000 years ago.

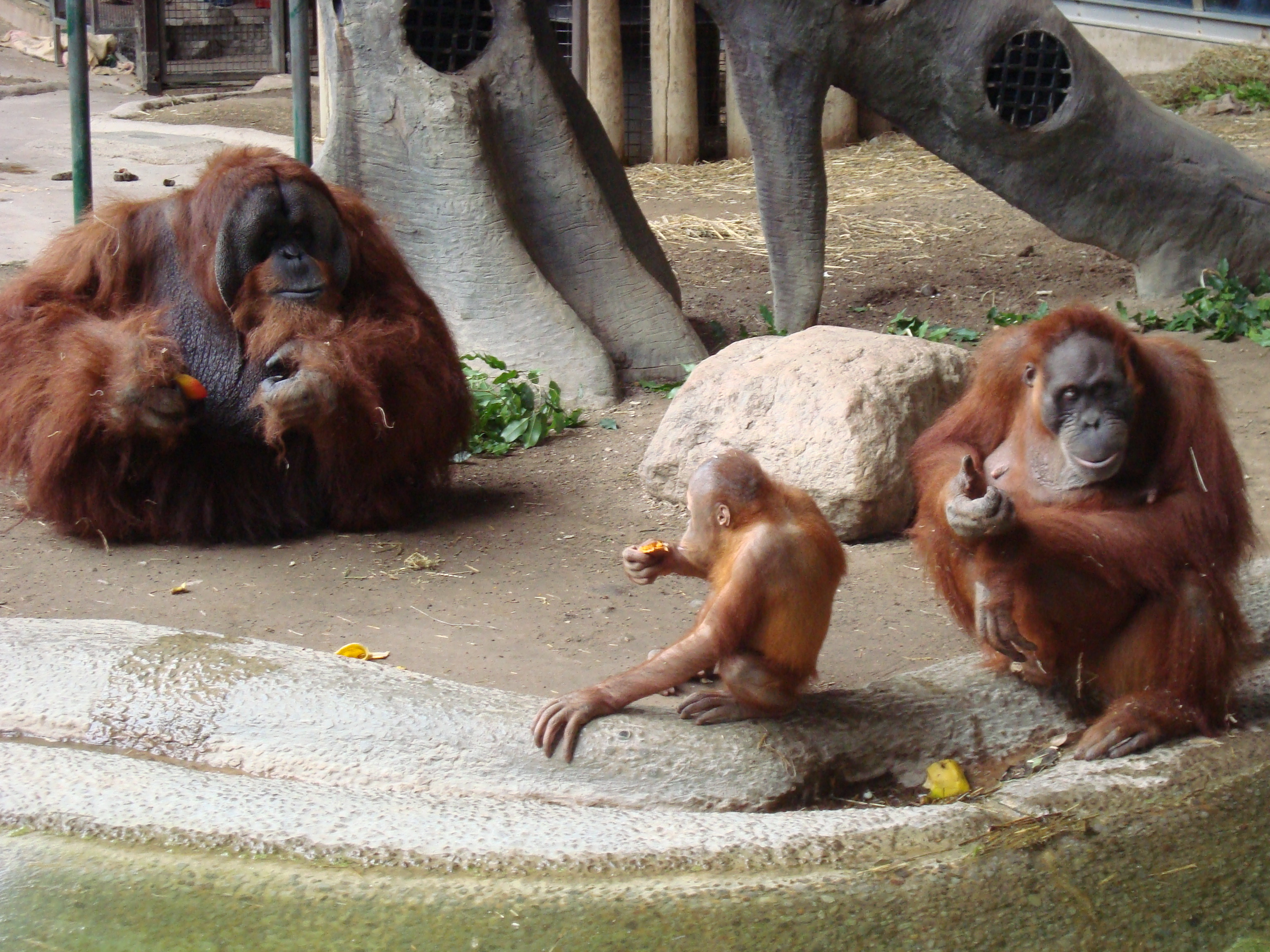
Orangutan males are not monogamous and compete for access to females.

Paleoanthropological estimates of the time frame for the evolution of monogamy are primarily based on the level of sexual dimorphism seen in the fossil record because, in general, the reduced male-male competition seen in monogamous mating results in reduced sexual dimorphism. According to Reno et al., the sexual dimorphism of Australopithecus afarensis, a human ancestor from approximately 3.9–3.0 million years ago, was within the modern human range, based on dental and postcranial morphology. Although careful not to say that this indicates monogamous mating in early hominids, the authors do say that reduced levels of sexual dimorphism in A. afarensis "do not imply that monogamy is any less probable than polygyny". However, Gordon, Green and Richmond claim that in examining postcranial remains, A. afarensis is more sexually dimorphic than modern humans and chimpanzees with levels closer to those of orangutans and gorillas. Furthermore, Homo habilis, living approximately 2.3 mya, is the most sexually dimorphic early hominid. Plavcan and van Schaik conclude their examination of this controversy by stating that, overall, sexual dimorphism in australopithecines is not indicative of any behavioral implications or mating systems.

Currently the oldest ethnic group in Africa, the continent where Homo sapiens species emerged, is the San people of Southern Africa. Most San are monogamous, but if a hunter is able to obtain enough food, he can afford to have a second wife as well. The monogamy practiced by this ethnic group is the serial monogamy.

=== Cultural arguments ===
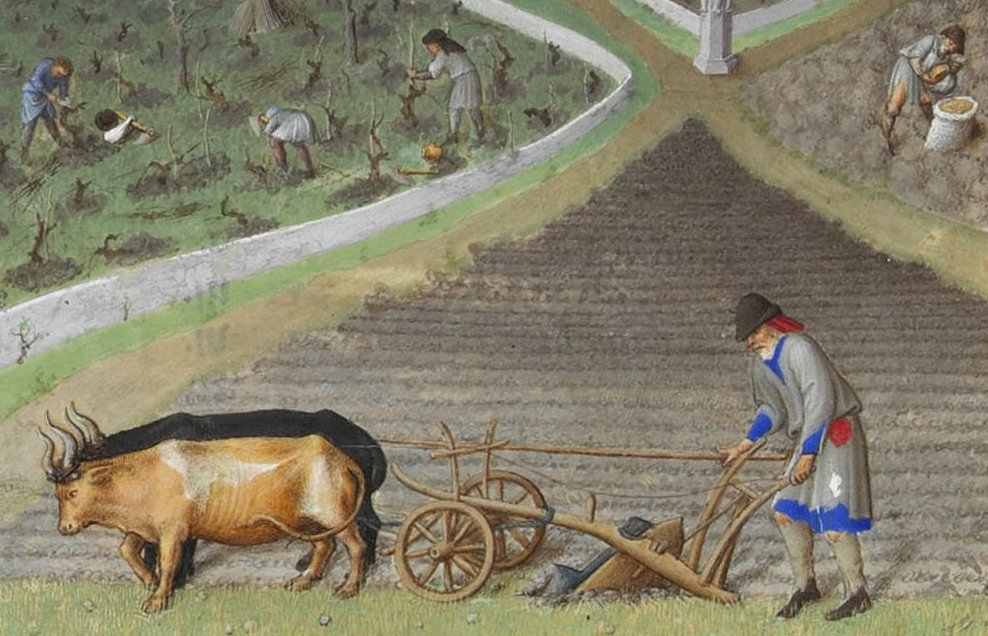
Plough agriculture. The castle in the background is Lusignan. Detail from the calendar Les très riches heures from the 15th century. This is a detail from the painting for March.

Despite the human ability to avoid sexual and genetic monogamy, social monogamy still forms under many different conditions, but most of those conditions are consequences of cultural processes. These cultural processes may have nothing to do with relative reproductive success. For example, anthropologist Jack Goody's comparative study utilizing the Ethnographic Atlas demonstrated that monogamy is part of a cultural complex found in the broad swath of Eurasian societies from Japan to Ireland that practice social monogamy, sexual monogamy and dowry (i.e. "diverging devolution", that allow property to be inherited by children of both sexes). Goody demonstrates a statistical correlation between this cultural complex and the development of intensive plough agriculture in those areas. Drawing on the work of Ester Boserup, Goody notes that the sexual division of labour varies in intensive plough agriculture and extensive shifting horticulture. In plough agriculture farming is largely men's work and is associated with private property; marriage tends to be monogamous to keep the property within the nuclear family. Close family (endogamy) are the preferred marriage partners to keep property within the group. A molecular genetic study of global human genetic diversity argued that sexual polygyny was typical of human reproductive patterns until the shift to sedentary farming communities approximately 10,000 to 5,000 years ago in Europe and Asia, and more recently in Africa and the Americas. A further study drawing on the Ethnographic Atlas showed a statistical correlation between increasing size of the society, the belief in "high gods" to support human morality, and monogamy. A survey of other cross-cultural samples has confirmed that the absence of the plough was the only predictor of polygamy, although other factors such as high male mortality in warfare (in non-state societies) and pathogen stress (in state societies) had some impact.

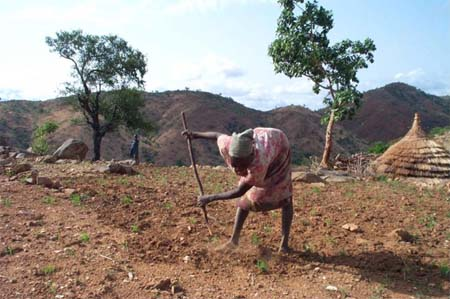
Woman farming, using a digging stick in the Nuba Mountains, southern Sudan

Betzig postulated that culture/society can also be a source of social monogamy by enforcing it through rules and laws set by third-party actors, usually in order to protect the wealth or power of the elite. For example, Augustus Caesar encouraged marriage and reproduction to force the aristocracy to divide their wealth and power among multiple heirs, but the aristocrats kept their socially monogamous, legitimate children to a minimum to ensure their legacy while having many extra-pair copulations. Similarly—according to Betzig—the Christian Church enforced monogamy because wealth passed to the closest living, legitimate male relative, often resulting in the wealthy oldest brother being without a male heir. Thus, the wealth and power of the family would pass to the "celibate" younger brother of the church. In both of these instances, the rule-making elite used cultural processes to ensure greater reproductive fitness for themselves and their offspring, leading to a larger genetic influence in future generations. According to B. S. Low, culture would appear to have a much larger impact on monogamy in humans than the biological forces that are important for non-human animals.

Other theorists use cultural factors influencing reproductive success to explain monogamy. During times of major economic/demographic transitions, investing more in fewer offspring (social monogamy not polygyny) increases reproductive success by ensuring the offspring themselves have enough initial wealth to be successful. This is seen in both England and Sweden during the industrial revolution and is currently being seen in the modernization of rural Ethiopia. Similarly, in modern industrialized societies, fewer yet better-invested offspring, i.e. social monogamy, can provide a reproductive advantage over social polygyny, but this still allows for serial monogamy and extra-pair copulations.

=== Arguments from outside the scientific community ===
Karol Wojtyła (later, Pope John Paul II) in his book Love and Responsibility postulated that monogamy, as an institutional union of two people being in love with one another, was an embodiment of an ethical personalistic norm, and thus the only means of making true human love possible. Some writers have suggested that monogamy may solve the problems they view as associated with non-monogamy and hypergamy such as inceldom.

Alexandra Kollontai in Make Way for the Winged Eros argues that monogamy is an artifact of capitalist concepts of property and inheritance and wrote, "The social aims of the working class are not affected one bit by whether love takes the form of a long and official union or is expressed in a temporary relationship. The ideology of the working class does not place any formal limits on love." Later, "Modern love always sins, because it absorbs the thoughts and feelings of 'loving hearts' and isolates the loving pair from the collective. In the future society, such a separation will not only become superfluous but also psychologically inconceivable." One of the tenets of the new proletarian morality is "mutual recognition of the rights of the other, of the fact that one does not own the heart and soul of the other (the sense of property, encouraged by bourgeois culture)".

Havelock Ellis advocates for monogamy in sexual relationships and considers it an expression closest to nature with a sufficient amount of mutuality.

Monogamy is the most natural expression of an impulse which cannot, as a rule, be so adequately realized in full fruition under conditions involving a less prolonged period of mutual communion and intimacy.

— Havelock Ellis (1921), Studies in the Psychology of Sex, Volume VI, Sex in Relation to Society, p. 426

This belief is said to be the case because "the sexes are always approximately equal" and that living organisms were designed around a sole partner, "while the needs of the emotional life, even apart from the needs of offspring, demand that such unions based on mutual attraction should be so far as possible permanent". The connection between a sexual partner, independent of the purpose of offspring, is prominently and stated to be akin to a necessity for the fulfillment of the "emotional life", and that this fulfillment can be reached in a monogamous relationship. Ellis acknowledges the existence of "variations" and considers it "inevitable oscillations around the norm", but excludes polygamy and discourages the practice of it. Monogamy as a whole being widely accepted in society is not seen as a notable accomplishment, and Ellis states that "the mere acceptance of a monogamic rule carries us but a little way".

=== Prehistoric societies ===
Recent anthropological data suggest that the modern concept of life-long monogamy has been in place for only the last 10,000 years. Genetic evidence has demonstrated that a greater proportion of men began contributing to the genetic pool between 5,000–10,000 years ago (i.e., there was an increase in women reproducing with different men rather than multiple women reproducing with the same man), which suggests that reproductive monogamy became more common at that time. This would correspond to the Neolithic agricultural revolution. During this time, formerly nomadic societies began to claim and settle land for farming, leading to the advent of property ownership and therefore inheritance. Men would therefore seek to ensure that their land would go to direct descendants and had a vested interest in limiting the sexual activities of their reproductive partners. It is possible that the concept of marriage and permanent monogamy evolved at this time. See also Cultural arguments above.

More recent genetic data has clarified that, in most regions throughout history, a smaller proportion of men contributed to human genetic history compared to women. This could occur if male mortality outpaced female mortality. This cannot be assumed with the available evidence. If an equal number of men and women are born and survive to reproduce, however, this would indicate that historically, only a subset of men fathered children and did so with multiple women (and may suggest that many men either did not procreate or did not have children that survived to create modern ancestors). This circumstance could occur for several reasons, but there are three common interpretations:

1. The first interpretation is a harem model, where one man will out-compete other men (presumably through acts of violence or power) for exclusive sexual access to a group of women. Groups of women could be related or unrelated. This does not seem to reflect real-world observations in more modern polygyny societies, where the majority of individuals seldom have more than one partner at a time.
2. Second, it may suggest that some men had either more sex or more reproductive success with multiple women simultaneously; this could be caused by sexual liaisons outside of a lifelong "monogamous" relationship (which may or may not be acceptable in their society), having multiple committed partners at once (polygyny), or simply sexual reproduction with multiple partners entirely outside of committed relationships (i.e., casual sex without relationships or pair-bonding).
3. Third, it may suggest that some men were more likely than other men to have a series of monogamous relationships that led to children with different women throughout the man's life (serial monogamy). There are a variety of explanations for this that range from the woman's influence (more woman choosing a specific man based on his perceived attractiveness or ability to produce food) to the man's (social or coercive power or increased mortality/absence in men compared to women).

The serial monogamy interpretation of genetic history would be congruent with other findings, such as the fact that humans form pair bonds (although not necessarily for life) and that human fathers invest in at least the early upbringing of their children. Serial monogamy would also be consistent with the existence of a "honeymoon period", a period of intense interest in a single sexual partner (with less interest in other women) which may help to keep men invested in staying with the mother of their child for this period. When reciprocated, this "honeymoon period" lasts 18 months to three years in most cases. This would correspond to the period necessary to bring a child to relative independence in the traditionally small, interdependent, communal societies of pre-Neolithic humans, before they settled into more separate agricultural communities.

While genetic evidence typically displays a bias towards a smaller number of men reproducing with more women, some regions or time periods have shown the opposite. In a 2019 investigation, Musharoff et al. applied modern techniques to the 1000 Genomes Project Phase 3 high-coverage Complete Genomics whole-genome dataset. They found that the Southern Han Chinese had a male bias (45% female, indicating that women were likely to reproduce with multiple men). This region is known for its lack of a concept of paternity and for a sense of female equality or superiority. The Musharoff study also found a male bias in Europeans (20% female) during an out-of-Africa migration event that may have increased the number of men successfully reproducing with women, perhaps by replenishing the genetic pool in Europe. The study did confirm a more typical female bias in Yorubans (63% female), Europeans (84%), Punjabis (82%), and Peruvians (56%).

According to other studies, coupling began or evolved gradually towards monogamy since millions of years ago.

Anthropologists characterize human beings as "mildly polygynous" or "monogamous with polygynous tendencies". This slight inclination towards polygamy is reinforced by the low rate of polygamy even in polygamist societies; less than five percent of men marry more than one woman in approximately half of polygynous societies. This slight inclination towards men reproducing with a small number of women is also seen in genetic evidence. Depending on the period of history, the average man with modern descendents appears to have had children with between 1.5 women (70,000 years ago) to 3.3 women (45,000 years ago), except in East Asia. This rate varied dramatically by era, possibly due to male mortality, environmental conditions, food availability, and other influences on mortality, and migration patterns. These rates may be consistent with a society that practices serial monogamy. However, there was a temporary but sharp decrease in the ratio during the start of the Neolithic resolution, where the average man with modern descendants had children with 17 women (circa 8,000 years ago). Given the dramatic cultural shifts towards sedentary agriculture at the time, this is speculated to represent a dramatic change from a community-based society towards the hoarding of power and resources more consistent with a harem model; however, the rapid movement back towards 4.5 women per man after this dip, accompanied by evidence for the move towards monogamy as the agricultural revolution progressed, may suggest a dramatic, unknown factor such as catastrophic male mortality. Some researchers have postulated alternative explanations for the reduction in male effective population size, such as the extinction of male lineages through warfare. In patrilineal clan-based societies, entire male bloodlines could be eradicated by a conquering tribe, while women were often absorbed into the victorious group. Women also traditionally joined their husband's family upon marriage, and this gene flow would have increased the likelihood of their lineages surviving. Another study proposed a more peaceful explanation involving variance in reproductive success among patrilineal groups combined with the gradual splitting of groups over time. These mechanisms could have led to a drastic reduction in male genetic diversity over time without requiring equivalently drastic reproductive ratios between the sexes.

=== Ancient societies ===
The historical record offers contradictory evidence on the development and extent of monogamy as a social practice. Laura Betzig argues that in the six large, highly stratified early states, commoners were generally monogamous but that elites practiced de facto polygyny. Those states included Mesopotamia, Egypt, Aztec Mexico, Inca Peru, India and China.

==== Tribal societies ====
Monogamy has appeared in some traditional tribal societies such as the Andamanese, Karen in Burma, Sami and Ket in northern Eurasia, and the Pueblo Indians of the United States, apparently unrelated to the development of the Christian monogamous paradigm.

==== Ancient Mesopotamia and Assyria ====
Both the Babylonian and Assyrian families were monogamous in principle but not entirely so in practice since polygyny was frequently practiced by the rulers.

In the patriarchal society of Mesopotamia the nuclear family was called a "house". In order "to build a house" a man was supposed to marry one woman and if she did not provide him with offspring, he could take a second wife. The Code of Hammurabi states that he loses his right to do so if the wife herself gives him a slave as concubine. According to Old Assyrian texts, he could be obliged to wait for two or three years before he was allowed to take another wife. The position of the second wife was that of a "slave girl" in respect to the first wife, as many marriage contracts explicitly state.

==== Ancient Egypt ====
Although an Egyptian man was free to marry several women at a time, and some wealthy men from Old and Middle Kingdoms did have more than one wife, monogamy was the norm. There may have been some exceptions, e.g. a Nineteenth Dynasty official stated as proof of his love to his deceased wife that he had stayed married to her since their youth, even after he had become very successful (P. Leiden I 371). This may suggest that some men abandoned first wives of a low social status and married women of higher status in order to further their careers although even then they lived with only one wife. Egyptian women had the right to ask for a divorce if their husband took a second wife. Many tomb reliefs testify to the monogamous character of Egyptian marriages; officials are usually accompanied by a supportive wife. "His wife X, his beloved" is the standard phrase identifying wives in tomb inscriptions. The instruction texts belonging to wisdom literature, e.g., Instruction of Ptahhotep or Instruction of Any, support fidelity to monogamous marriage life, calling the wife a Lady of the house. The Instruction of Ankhsheshonq suggests that it is wrong to abandon a wife because she is not capable of pregnancy.

==== Ancient Israel ====
As against Betzig's contention that monogamy evolved as a result of Christian socio-economic influence in the West, monogamy appeared widespread in the ancient Middle East much earlier. In Israel's pre-Christian era, an essentially monogamous ethos underlay the Jewish creation story (Gn 2) and the last chapter of Proverbs. During the Second Temple period (530 BCE to 70 CE), apart from an economic situation which supported monogamy even more than in earlier period, the concept of "mutual fidelity" between husband and wife was a quite common reason for strictly monogamous marriages. Some marriage documents explicitly expressed a desire for the marriage to remain monogamous. Examples of these documents were found in Elephantine. They resemble those found in neighbouring Assyria and Babylonia. Study shows that ancient Middle East societies, though not strictly monogamous, were practically (at least on commoners' level) monogamous. Halakha of the Dead Sea Sect saw prohibition of polygamy as coming from the Pentateuch (Damascus Document 4:20–5:5, one of the Dead Sea Scrolls). Christianity adopted a similar attitude (cf. 1 Tm 3:2,12; Tt 1:6), which conformed with Jesus' approach. Michael Coogan, in contrast, states that "Polygyny continued to be practised well into the biblical period, and it is attested among Jews as late as the second century CE."

Under Judges and the monarchy, old restrictions went into disuse, especially among royalty, though the Books of Samuel and Kings, which cover entire period of monarchy, record only one instance of commoner polygamy - that of Samuel's father. The wisdom e.g. Book of Wisdom, which provides a picture of the society, Sirach, Proverbs, Qohelet portray a woman in a strictly monogamous family (cf. Pr 5:15-19; Qo 9:9; Si 26:1-4 and eulogy of perfect wife, Proverbs 31:10-31). The Book of Tobias speaks solely of monogamous marriages. Also prophets have in front of their eyes monogamous marriage as an image of the relationship of God and Israel. (Cf. Ho 2:4f; Jer 2:2; Is 50:1; 54:6-7; 62:4-5; Ez 16). Roland de Vaux states that "it is clear that the most common form of marriage in Israel was monogamy".

The Mishnah and the baraitot clearly reflect a monogamist viewpoint within Judaism (Yevamot 2:10 etc.). Some sages condemned marriage to two wives even for the purpose of procreation (Ketubot 62b). R. Ammi, an amora states:

Whoever takes a second wife in addition to his first one shall divorce the first and pay her kettubah (Yevamot 65a)

Roman customs, which prohibited polygamy, may have enhanced such an attitude - especially after 212 AD, when all the Jews became Roman citizens. However, some Jews continued to practice bigamy (e.g. up to medieval times in Egypt and Europe). Fourth-century Roman law forbade Jews to contract plural marriages.

A synod convened by Gershom ben Judah around 1000 CE banned polygamy among Ashkenazi and Sephardic Jews.

==== Ancient Greece and ancient Rome ====
The ancient Greeks and Romans were monogamous in the sense that men were not allowed to have more than one wife or to cohabit with concubines during marriage.

==== Early Christianity ====
As John Paul II interpreted the dialogue between Jesus and the Pharisees (Gospel of Matthew 19:3–8), Christ emphasized the primordial beauty of monogamic spousal love described in the Book of Genesis 1:26–31, 2:4–25, whereby a man and woman by their nature are each ready to be a beautifying, total and personal gift to one another:

Jesus avoids entangling himself in juridical or casuistic controversies; instead, he appeals twice to the "beginning". By doing so, he clearly refers to the relevant words of Genesis, which his interlocutors also know by heart. ... it clearly leads the interlocutors to reflect about the way in which, in the mystery of creation, man was formed precisely as "male and female", in order to understand correctly the normative meaning of the words of Genesis.

=== Contemporary societies ===
==== International ====
Western European societies established monogamy as their marital norm. Monogamous marriage is normative and is legally enforced in most developed countries. Laws prohibiting polygyny were adopted in Japan (1880), China (1953), India (1955) and Nepal (1963). Polyandry is illegal in most countries.

The women's rights movements seek to make monogamy the only legal form of marriage. The United Nations General Assembly in 1979 adopted the Convention on the Elimination of All Forms of Discrimination Against Women, Article 16 of which requires nations to give women and men equal rights in marriage. Polygamy is viewed as inconsistent with the Article as it gives men the right of multiple wives, but not to women. The United Nations has established the Committee on the Elimination of Discrimination against Women (CEDAW) to monitor the progress of nations implementing the convention.

==== People's Republic of China ====
The founders of Communism determined that monogamous marriage inherently oppressed women and therefore had no place in communist society. Friedrich Engels stated that compulsory monogamy could only lead to increased prostitution and general immorality, with the benefits of restricting capital and solidifying the class structure. As he spelled out in The Origin of the Family, Private Property and the State (1884),

The first class antagonism which appears in history coincides with the development of the antagonism between man and woman in monogamian marriage, and the first class oppression with that of the female sex by the male. ... [T]he wellbeing and development of the one group are attained by the misery and repression of the other.

The monogamous family is distinguished from the pairing family by the far greater durability of wedlock, which can no longer be dissolved at the pleasure of either party. As a rule, it is only the man who can still dissolve it and cast off his wife.

However, the communist revolutionaries in China chose to take the Western viewpoint of monogamy as giving women and men equal rights in marriage. The newly formed Communist government established monogamy as the only legal form of marriage.

"The 1950 Marriage Law called for sweeping changes in many areas of family life. It forbade any 'arbitrary and compulsory' form of marriage that would be based on the superiority of men and would ignore women's interests. The new democratic marriage system was based on the free choice of couples, monogamy, equal rights for both sexes, and the protection of the lawful interests of women. It abolished the begetting of male offspring as the principal purpose of marriage and weakened kinship ties which reduced the pressure on women to bear many children, especially sons. With arranged marriages prohibited, young women could choose their own marriage partners, share the financial cost of setting up a new household, and have equal status in household and family decision-making. The Government then initiated an extensive campaign of marriage-law education, working jointly with the Communist Party, women's federations, trade unions, the armed forces, schools and other organizations."

While the protocol does not suggest making polygamous marriage illegal, Article 6 does state that "monogamy is encouraged as the preferred form of marriage and that the rights of women in marriage and family, including in polygamous marital relationships are promoted and protected." The protocol entered into force on 25 November 2005.

== Varieties in biology ==
Recent discoveries have led biologists to talk about the three varieties of monogamy: social monogamy, sexual monogamy, and genetic monogamy. The distinction between these three are important to the modern understanding of monogamy.

Monogamous pairs of animals are not always sexually exclusive. Many animals that form pairs to mate and raise offspring regularly engage in sexual activities with partners other than their primary mate. This is called extra-pair copulation. Sometimes these extra-pair sexual activities lead to offspring. Genetic tests frequently show that some of the offspring raised by a monogamous pair come from the female mating with an extra-pair male partner. These discoveries have led biologists to adopt new ways of talking about monogamy:

Social monogamy refers to a male and female's social living arrangement (e.g., shared use of a territory, behaviour indicative of a social pair, and/or proximity between a male and female) without inferring any sexual interactions or reproductive patterns. In humans, social monogamy equals monogamous marriage. Sexual monogamy is defined as an exclusive sexual relationship between a female and a male based on observations of sexual interactions. Finally, the term genetic monogamy is used when DNA analyses can confirm that a female-male pair reproduce exclusively with each other. A combination of terms indicates examples where levels of relationships coincide, e.g., sociosexual and sociogenetic monogamy describe corresponding social and sexual, and social and genetic monogamous relationships, respectively.

— Reichard, 2003, (p. 4)

Whatever makes a pair of animals socially monogamous does not necessarily make them sexually or genetically monogamous. Social monogamy, sexual monogamy, and genetic monogamy can occur in different combinations.

Social monogamy does not always involve marriage in humans. A married couple is almost always a socially monogamous couple. But couples who choose to cohabit without getting married can also be socially monogamous. The popular science author Matt Ridley in his book The Red Queen: Sex and the Evolution of Human Nature, described the human mating system as "monogamy plagued by adultery".

=== Serial monogamy ===
Serial monogamy is a mating practice in which individuals may engage in sequential monogamous pairings, or in terms of humans, when men or women can marry another partner but only after ceasing to be married to the previous partner.

Serial monogamy may effectively resemble polygyny in its reproductive consequences because both men and women are able to utilize both sexes reproductive lifespan through repeated marriages.

Serial monogamy may also refer to sequential sexual relationships, irrespective of marital status. A pair of humans may remain sexually exclusive, or monogamous, until the relationship has ended and then each may go on to form a new exclusive pairing with a different partner. This pattern of serial monogamy is common among people in Western cultures.

==== Reproductive success ====
Evolutionary theory predicts that males would be apt to seek more mating partners than females because they obtain higher reproductive benefits from such a strategy. Men with more serial marriages are likely to have more children than men with only one spouse, whereas the same is not true of women with consecutive spouses. A study done in 1994 found that remarried men often had a larger age difference from their spouses than men who were married for the first time, suggesting that serial monogamy helps some men extract a longer reproductive window from their spouses.

==== Breakup ====
Serial monogamy has always been closely linked to divorce practices. Whenever procedures for obtaining divorce have been simple and easy, serial monogamy has been found. As divorce has continued to become more accessible, more individuals have availed themselves of it, and many go on to remarry. Barry Schwartz, author of The Paradox of Choice: Why More is Less, further suggests that Western culture's inundation of choice has devalued relationships based on lifetime commitments and singularity of choice. It has been suggested, however, that high mortality rates in centuries past accomplished much the same result as divorce, enabling remarriage (of one spouse) and thus serial monogamy.

==== Similarity with polygamy ====
According to Danish scholar Miriam K. Zeitzen, anthropologists treat serial monogamy, in which divorce and remarriage occur, as a form of polygamy as it also can establish a series of households that may continue to be tied by shared paternity and shared income. As such, they are similar to the household formations created through divorce and serial monogamy.

=== Mating system ===
Monogamy is one of several mating systems observed in animals. However, a pair of animals may be socially monogamous without necessarily being sexually or genetically monogamous. Social monogamy, sexual monogamy, and genetic monogamy can occur in different combinations.

Social monogamy refers to the overtly observed living arrangement whereby a male and female share territory and engage in behaviour indicative of a social pair, but does not imply any particular sexual fidelity or reproductive pattern. The extent to which social monogamy is observed in animals varies across taxa, with over 90 percent of avian species being socially monogamous, compared to only 3 percent of mammalian species and up to 15 percent of primate species. Social monogamy has also been observed in reptiles, fish, and insects.

Sexual monogamy is defined as an exclusive sexual relationship between a female and a male based on observations of sexual interactions. However, scientific analyses can test for paternity, for example by DNA paternity testing or by fluorescent pigment powder tracing of females to track physical contact. This type of analysis can uncover reproductively successful sexual pairings or physical contact. Genetic monogamy refers to DNA analyses confirming that a female-male pair reproduce exclusively with each other.

The incidence of sexual monogamy appears quite rare in other parts of the animal kingdom. It is becoming clear that even animals that are overtly socially monogamous engage in extra-pair copulations. For example, while over 90% of birds are socially monogamous, "on average, 30% or more of the baby birds in any nest [are] sired by someone other than the resident male." Patricia Adair Gowaty has estimated that, out of 180 different species of socially monogamous songbirds, only 10% are sexually monogamous. Offspring are far more successful when both the male and the female members of the social pair contribute food resources.

The highest known frequency of reproductively successful extra-pair copulations are found among fairywrens Malurus splendens and Malurus cyaneus where more than 65% of chicks are fathered by males outside the supposed breeding pair. This discordantly low level of genetic monogamy has been a surprise to biologists and zoologists, as social monogamy can no longer be assumed to determine how genes are distributed in a species.

Elacatinus, also widely known as neon gobies, also exhibit social monogamy. Hetereosexual pairs of fish belonging to the genus Elacatinus remain closely associated during both reproductive and non-reproductive periods, and often reside in same cleaning station to serve client fish. Fish of this genus frequently mate with a new partner after they are widowed.

=== Evolution in animals ===
Socially monogamous species are scattered throughout the animal kingdom: A few insects, a few fish, about nine-tenths of birds, and a few mammals are socially monogamous. There is even a parasitic worm, Schistosoma mansoni, that in its female-male pairings in the human body is monogamous. The diversity of species with social monogamy suggests that it is not inherited from a common ancestor but instead evolved independently in many different species.

The low occurrence of social monogamy in placental mammals has been claimed to be related to the presence or absence of estrus—or oestrus—the duration of sexual receptivity of a female. This, however, does not explain why estrus females generally mate with any proximate male nor any correlation between sexual and social monogamy. Birds, which are notable for a high incidence of social monogamy, do not have estrus.

=== Genetic and neuroendocrine bases ===
The prairie vole is an animal example for its monogamous social behaviour, since the male is usually socially faithful to the female, and shares in the raising of pups. The woodland vole is also usually monogamous. Another species from the same genus, the meadow vole, has promiscuously mating males, and scientists have changed adult male meadow voles' behaviour to resemble that of prairie voles in experiments in which a single gene was introduced into the brain by a virus.

The behaviour is influenced by the number of repetitions of a particular string of microsatellite DNA. Male prairie voles with the longest DNA strings spend more time with their mates and pups than male prairie voles with shorter strings. However, other scientists have disputed the gene's relationship to monogamy, and cast doubt on whether the human version plays an analogous role. Physiologically, pair-bonding behavior has been shown to be connected to vasopressin, dopamine, and oxytocin levels, with the genetic influence apparently arising via the number of receptors for these substances in the brain; the pair-bonding behavior has also been shown in experiments to be strongly modifiable by administering some of these substances directly.

The North American microtine rodent's (vole) complex social structure and social behavior has provided unique opportunities to study the underlying neural bases for monogamy and social attachment. Data from studies using the Microtus ochrogaster or prairie vole indicate that the neuroendocrine hormones, oxytocin (in female prairie voles) and vasopressin (in male prairie voles) play a central role in the development of affiliative connections during mating. The effects of intracerebroventricular administration of oxytocin and vasopressin have been shown to promote affiliative behavior in the prairie vole but not in similar, but non-monogamous montane voles. This difference in neuropeptide effect is attributed to the location, density, and distribution of OT and AVP receptors. Only in the prairie voles are OT and AVP receptors located along the mesolimbic dopamine reward pathway, presumably conditioning the voles to their mates odor while consolidating the social memory of the mating episode. This finding highlights the role of genetic evolution in altering the neuroanatomical distribution of receptors, resulting in certain neural circuits becoming sensitive to changes in neuropeptides.

== See also ==
- Affair
- Amatonormativity
- Human bonding
- Investment model of commitment
- Polygamy in Christianity
- Pair bonding
- Paternal care
- Sexual intercourse
- The seven-year itch

== Bibliography ==
- de Vaux R. O.P. (1973). "Marriage - 1. Polygamy and monogamy". Ancient Israel. Its Life and Institutions. London: Darton, Longman & Todd. pp. 24–26. ISBN 978-0-232-51219-9.
- John Paul II (2006). Man and Woman He created Them. A Theology of the Body 1,2-4. M. Waldstein (trans.). Boston: Paoline Books & Media. pp. 132–133. ISBN 978-0-8198-7421-4.
- "Marriage". Encyclopaedia Judaica. Vol. 11. Jerusalem-New York: Encyclopaedia Judaica Jerusalem — The MacMillan Company. 1971. pp. 1026–1051.
- "Monogamy". Encyclopaedia Judaica. Vol. 12. Jerusalem-New York: Encyclopaedia Judaica Jerusalem — The MacMillan Company. 1971. pp. 258–260.
- Pinch Geraldine, Private Life in Ancient Egypt in: J. M. Sasson; J. Baines; G. Beckman; K. S. Rubinson (assist.), eds. (1995). Civilizations of the Ancient Near East. Vol. 1. New York: Simon & Schuster Macmillan. pp. 363–381. ISBN 978-0-684-19720-3.
- Stol Marten: Private Life in Ancient Mesopotamia, in: J. M. Sasson; J. Baines; G. Beckman; K. S. Rubinson (assist.), eds. (1995). Civilizations of the Ancient Near East. Vol. 1. New York: Simon & Schuster Macmillan. pp. 486–501. ISBN 978-0-684-19720-3..
- Wojtyła, Karol (1981). "Marriage. Monogamy and the indissolubility of Marriage". Love and Responsibility. San Francisco: Ignatius Press. pp. 211–216. ISBN 978-0-89870-445-7.
