= Carol R. Ember =

American cultural anthropologist

- Born: July 7, 1943 (age 82); Brooklyn, New York, United States
- Occupation: Cross Cultural Anthropology
- Known for: Co-authored many books on anthropology
- Spouse(s): Melvin Ember, m. 1970–2009 (his death)

Carol R. Ember (born July 7, 1943) is an American cultural anthropologist, cross-cultural researcher and a writer of books on anthropology. She is now the President of the Human Relations Area Files at Yale University.

== Biography ==
Carol R. Ember was born on July 7, 1943. Initially, she studied at Antioch College as a chemistry major. She then switched majors to sociology/anthropology. After studying sociology for one year in the graduate school at Cornell University she moved to Harvard University for doctoral studies on anthropology, basically under the guidance of John and Beatrice Whiting. For her doctoral thesis, she went to Kenya to work and study children's behavior among the Luo people. This study indicated that several boys were engaged in duties which otherwise the girls would perform, like caring for children and domestic works as their mothers were mostly engaged in agriculture work and there were not so many girls in the family who could help her. Ember studied this social pattern in depth by systematic behavioral observations of the boys in comparison with the girls. She noted that boys who did the work normally assigned to girls were "intermediate in many social behaviors, compared with the other boys and girls". Following this study, she continued her research in the field of cross-cultural anthropology, studying "variation in marriage, family, descent groups, and war and peace."

Much of her cross-cultural research was done with Melvin Ember, whom she married in 1970; he died in 2009. Her most recent interdisciplinary research, supported by the National Science Foundation, has been on the effect of natural hazards on culture.

Ember started her professional career by teaching at the Hunter College of the City University of New York and worked there from 1970 to 1996. | Ember was president of the Society of Cross-Cultural Research and was one of the directors of the Summer Institutes in Comparative Anthropological Research, which received funding from the National Science Foundation. From 1996 to 2009 she worked as executive director of the Human Relations Area Files, Inc., (HRAF) a nonprofit research agency of Yale University. She became President of HRAF in 2010. Ember was the President-Elect, President and Past-President of the Society for Anthropological Sciences from 2009 to 2015. Ember is engaged now as the editor of the journal Cross-Cultural Research.

== Publications ==
Ember has coauthored many books. These include: Cultural Anthropology with Melvin Ember as co-author, which is now in its 15th edition; Anthropology with Melvin Ember and Peter N. Peregrine as coauthors also is in its 15th edition; Cross-Cultural Research Methods, with Melvin Ember as co-author, which is in its 2nd edition; Physical Anthropology and Archaeology with Melvin Ember and Peter N. Peregrine as co-authors; Human Culture: Highlights of Cultural Anthropology with Melvin Ember as co-author; Human Evolution and Culture: Highlights of Anthropology with Melvin Ember and Peter N. Peregrine as co-authors. She has also co-edited Archaeology: Original Readings in Method and Practice (Peter N. Peregrine is the first editor; also with Melvin Ember). This book has 25 articles by well-known archaeologists covering a complete range of archaeological methods and related issues and controversies in present-day archaeology. Another edited reader is Physical Anthropology: Original Readings in Method and Practice (Peter N. Peregrine is the first editor; also with Melvin Ember). A Canadian edition of Physical Anthropology and Archaeology is co-authored with Peregrine and Robert D. Hoppa. This is available in CD Rom format also and is an introductory to physical anthropology and archaeology with particular detailing on "human evolution, major revolutions in human cultural evolution, contemporary variation in humans, and practical applications of anthropology and archaeology."

Ember has also edited or co-edited a number of encyclopedias: Encyclopedia of Urban Cultures, Encyclopedia of Medical Anthropology, Encyclopedia of Sex and Gender, Encyclopedia of Diasporas, and Countries and Their Cultures.

== Bibliography ==
- Ember, Carol R.; Ember, Melvin Ember (1 January 1977). Anthropology. Prentice-Hall. ISBN 978-0-13-036962-8.
- Ember, Carol R.; Peregrine, Peter N.; Hoppa, Robert D. (April 2006). Physical Anthropology and Archaeology, Second Canadian Edition with AnthroNotes Study Chart. Pearson Education Canada. ISBN 978-0-13-238223-6.
- Peregrine, Peter Neal; Ember, Carol R.; Ember, Melvin (2002). Archaeology: Original Readings in Method and Practice. Prentice Hall. ISBN 978-0-13-093978-4.
