= Raoul Naroll =

Canadian-American anthropologist and academic

Raoul Naroll (September 10, 1920 – June 25, 1985) was a Canadian-born American anthropologist who did much to promote the methodology of cross-cultural studies.

== Early life and education ==
Naroll was born in Toronto, Ontario but was raised in Los Angeles and attended UCLA at the age of 16, dropping out in his junior year to join the military.

In 1939, he joined the army serving in Infantry, as an Officer in the Army Finance Department and in the Military Intelligence Service, screening officials and prisoners of war in Germany.

After the war, Naroll returned to UCLA, receiving an A.B. in 1950, a Master's in 1952, and his Ph.D. in history in 1953. He did fieldwork in Austria (1956) and in Greece, Switzerland and Belgium (1965–1966).

== Career ==
From 1954 to 1955, Naroll was a fellow at the Center for Advanced Study in the Behavioral Sciences at Stanford University. After, he moved to the Washington, D.C. branch of the Human Relations Area Files, Inc. (HRAF) working as a research associate where he wrote country background studies.

Naroll was a member of the faculty of the San Fernando Valley State College (later renamed California State University, Northridge) (1957–1962), Northwestern University (1962–1967), the University at Buffalo (1967–1984), and was a past president of the Human Relations Area Files.

The author of eight books, several articles and book reviews, Naroll did research in many disciplines. His first book, Data Quality Control, a new research technique; prolegomena to a cross-cultural study of culture stress, concerns the issue of trustworthiness of data and methodology used in studying cultures. Much of his later research was concerned with the application of cross-cultural anthropological theory to historical data. Texts such as Imperial Cycles and World Order (1966) and Military Deterrence in History (1974) point to Naroll's concerns and scholarship on war and military studies. The Moral Order: An Introduction to the Human Situation (1983) is a broad, evolutionary study of ten factors of social life, from a cross-cultural perspective.

== Publications ==
- Data Quality Control (1962)
- Imperial Cycles and World Order (1966)
- Handbook of Method in Cultural Anthropology (1970)
- Main Currents in Cultural Anthropology (1973)
- Military Deterrence in History: A Pilot Cross Historical Survey (1974)
- HRAFLIB (HRAF Hologeistic Computer Program Library) (1975)
- Worldwide Theory Testing (1976)
- The Moral Order: An Introduction to the Human Situation (1983)
