= Richard Blanton =

American academic

Richard Edward Blanton
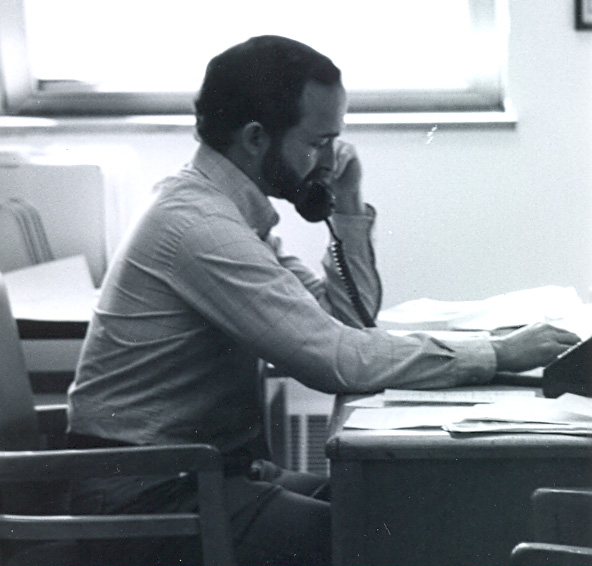
- Born: November 16, 1943 (age 82)
- Citizenship: American
- Education: University of Michigan (PhD 1970)
- Known for: • Mesoamerican early state formation • excavations at Monte Albán • economic anthropology • cross-cultural research
- Awards: Fellow, American Association for the Advancement of Science
- Scientific career
- Fields: anthropology, archaeology
- Workplaces: Purdue University, Indiana USA
- Academic advisors: Kent V. Flannery
- Notable students: Gary M. Feinman, Field Museum Laura Finsten, McMaster University Peter N. Peregrine, Lawrence University

Richard Edward Blanton (born November 16, 1943) is an American anthropologist, archaeologist, and academic. He is most renowned for his archaeological field and theoretical research into the development of civilizations in pre-Columbian Mesoamerica, particularly those from the central Mexican plateau and Valley of Oaxaca regions. Blanton taught at Rice University and Hunter College of the City University of New York before joining the faculty at Purdue University in 1976. He is currently (as of 2017) Professor Emeritus of Anthropology at Purdue's College of Liberal Arts.

Blanton helped to develop full coverage survey methods, which he and colleagues applied to the Valley of Oaxaca to help understand the evolution of the Monte Alban state. The particular method developed by Blanton and his students influenced a generation of archaeologists and are still widely used today.

Due to his interest in regional survey, Blanton helped to introduce methods of spatial analysis into archaeology. In particular he took an application of graph theory used by architects evaluate movement through buildings and developed it into a method for analyzing prehistoric houses and communities. He was able to demonstrate that variation in the layout of houses and communities was associated with wealth differences. In addition, Blanton's method was used to develop a measure of prehistoric warfare frequency that has proven useful in a number of settings.

Blanton was an early proponent of world-systems theory, and actively applied it to the evolution of Mesoamerican polities. Although this work was criticized at the time, it was further developed an employed by many scholars

Blanton also helped to develop dual processual theory, Dual-processual theory posits that political leaders employ one of two basic processes to build and maintain power. Using the first, called a “network” strategy, political leaders use ties to other polities, supernatural powers, or sources of esoteric knowledge and goods to build power, and maintain it by excluding others from access to those sources of power. Using the second, called a “corporate” strategy, political leaders use the bonds of kinship and social groups to build power, sharing access to those groups broadly, but positioning him or herself as the “first among equals.” These are not intended to be seen as exclusive categories, but rather as ends of a continuum of political strategy. Dual-processual theory has had significant impact on archaeological thought.
