= Gary M. Feinman =

American archaeologist

- Born: 1951 (age 74–75)
- Citizenship: American
- Education: Stuyvesant High School (1969), University of Michigan (BA 1972), CUNY Graduate Center (PhD 1980)
- Known for: Mesoamerican archaeology, early state formation archaeological survey and excavation in the Valley of Oaxaca, archaeological survey in Shandong, China
- Awards: Fellow, American Association for the Advancement of Science; Presidential Recognition Award, Society for American Archaeology
- Scientific career
- Fields: archaeology
- Workplaces: Field Museum of Natural History, Chicago, IL USA
- Academic advisors: Richard Blanton; Gregory Johnson

Gary M. Feinman (born 1951) is an American archaeologist, and the MacArthur Curator of Mesoamerican, Central American, and East Asian Anthropology at the Field Museum of Natural History in Chicago. He was a part of the Valley of Oaxaca Settlement Pattern Project which focused on the evolution of the Monte Albán state and shifts in settlement in the region over three millennia. The members of the Valley of Oaxaca Settlement Pattern Project and their colleagues have now walked over the largest contiguous archaeological survey region in the world, more than 8000 sq km.

Overall, Feinman has conducted research in the Valley of Oaxaca, Mexico for over 40 years, most recently in the lands of the communities Tlacolula, Mitla, Matatlán, and Ejutla. These studies mostly focused on household excavations at three sites (Ejutla, El Palmillo, and the Mitla Fortress). Most recently, he excavated at Lambityeco in collaboration with representatives of the Mexican Institute of Anthropology and History. At Lambityeco, Feinman and colleagues have documented a large Classic-period ball court, which was not previously recorded during surface mapping of this site. The Field Museum of Natural History team also found the largest carved stone ever recovered at this site.

Since 1995 Feinman has also been conducting archaeological survey in coastal Shandong Province, China in conjunction with Shandong University. The coastal Shandong settlement pattern research, spearheaded by Feinman, Linda Nicholas (Field Museum), and Professor Fang Hui (Shandong University) has had a role in introducing this regional-scale systematic field methodology to Chinese archaeology. The team has documented a large segment of the ancient Qi Great Wall, which was built during the Warring States period, and ultimately was breached by Qin armies just prior to the first unification of China. Presently, more than 3000 square kilometers have been systematically surveyed, the largest area covered by foot in East Asia.

Feinman is the author of several hundred articles, books, and book chapters. He is the founding co-editor of the Journal of Archaeological Research, Chief Editor of Frontiers of Human Dynamics: Institutions and Collective Action, past editor of Latin American Antiquity, and a Fellow of the American Association for the Advancement of Science. The Journal of Archaeological Research is presently the highest ranked Archaeology and Anthropology journal for Impact Factor.

== Contributions to Archaeology ==
Feinman helped to develop full coverage survey methods, which he and colleagues applied to the Valley of Oaxaca to help understand the evolution of the Monte Alban state The particular method developed by Feinman and colleagues Richard Blanton and Stephen Kowalewski influenced a generation of archaeologists and are still widely used today. Feinman continues to employ and refine this method in his ongoing work in the Valley of Oaxaca and Shandong Province, China.

Feinman was an early proponent of world-systems theory, and actively applied it to the evolution of Mesoamerican and Southwestern US polities. Although this work was criticized at the time, it was further developed and employed by many scholars. This early discussion helped establish a more systematic archaeological approach and concepts for the analysis of the macroregional scale.

Feinman also helped to develop dual processual theory, which has had a broad impact in American archaeology. This researched has morphed to more theoretically grounded framework focused on Collective Action, modes of governance, and variability in their fiscal foundations. In a series of collaborative publications he has used this approach to compare modes of governance across prehispanic Mesoamerica and in the premodern world more generally.

Recent studies, underpinned by a career of regional survey and residential excavation, have offered new perspectives on prehispanic Mesoamerican economies, in which most production for exchange was undertaken in domestic contexts and marketplace exchanges had a central importance. This model is markedly different than prior perspectives that presumed centralized/administered production and exchange. In addition to drawing on results from survey and excavation, Feinman, in conjunction with Linda Nicholas, Mark Golitko and colleagues from Mexico and the United States, has begun an effort to greatly increase the quantity of sourced obsidian from documented prehispanic contexts in the Valley of Oaxaca. By combining these newly sourced sets of obsidian data from Oaxaca with a larger archive of sourced obsidian from across prehispanic Mesoamerica, Feinman and colleagues have documented significant shifts in networks of exchange over time, while casting further doubt on extant models that presume the prevalence of state-controlled economies and redistribution.

Feinman is the co-curator of two permanent exhibitions at the Field Museum: the Ancient Americas, and the Cyrus Tang Hall of China. He also served as curator for a number of temporary exhibitions, including Chocolate, The Aztec World, China's First Emperor and His Terracotta Warriors, Death: Life's Greatest Mystery, and Mexican Nativity Scenes.

With T. Douglas Price, Feinman is the author of the amply illustrated world prehistory text, Images of the Past, which presently is in its 9th edition.
