= Standard Cross-Cultural Sample =

Ethnographic dataset

The Standard Cross-Cultural Sample (SCCS) is a sample of 186 cultures used by scholars engaged in cross-cultural studies.

== Origin ==
Cross-cultural research entails a particular statistical problem, known as Phylogenetic autocorrelation: tests of functional relationships (for example, a test of the hypothesis that societies with pronounced male dominance are more warlike) can be confounded because the samples of cultures are not independent. Traits can be associated not only because they are functionally related, but because they were transmitted together either through cross-cultural borrowing or through descent from a common cultural ancestor.

George Peter Murdock attempted to tackle the problem of autocorrelation by developing a sample of cultures relatively independent from each other—i.e., with relatively weak phylogenetic and cultural diffusion relationships. Murdock began with the twelve hundred or so peoples in his Ethnographic Atlas (Murdock, 1967), dividing them into roughly 200 "sampling provinces" of closely related cultures. Murdock and Douglas R. White chose one particularly well-documented culture from each sampling province to create the SCCS (Murdock and White, 1969). The number of cultures is large and varied enough to provide a sound basis for statistical analysis; the sample includes 186 cultures, ranging from contemporary hunter gatherers (e.g., the Mbuti), to early historic states (e.g., the Romans), to contemporary industrial peoples (e.g., the Russians) (Silverman & Messinger 1997; Mace & Pagel 1994).

Scholars engaging in statistical cross-cultural analysis are encouraged to use the set of cultures in the SCCS, since each new study adds to the number of coded variables capable of being used with already existing variables. By focusing scholarly attention on this sample of 186 cultures, the data have steadily improved in scope and quality. The open access electronic journal World Cultures, founded by White, published by William Divale, and now edited by J. Patrick Gray, functions as the repository of the SCCS, archiving the now nearly 2000 coded variables and publishing a number of papers on cross-cultural methodology. The journal moved in 2006 to the University of California eScholarship Repository.

Murdock also founded the Human Relations Area Files (HRAF) at Yale University in the 1940s. HRAF now maintains all the underlying ethnographic documents used by Murdock and White to code the cultures in the SCCS, in addition to the sources for most of the more-contemporary HRAF entries. The SCCS is selectable as a sample restriction on HRAF search engine for HRAF member organizations. Summaries for each culture are available to the public on the eHRAF World Cultures website.

The dataset is available to view on the Database of Places, Language, Culture, and Environment (D-PLACE).

== Cultures in the Standard Cross-Cultural Sample ==
Africa	Nama (Hottentot); Kung (San); Thonga; Lozi; Mbundu; Suku; Bemba; Nyakyusa (Ngonde); Hadza; Luguru; Kikuyu; Ganda; Mbuti (Pygmies); Nkundo (Mongo); Banen; Tiv; Igbo; Fon; Ashanti (Twi); Mende; Bambara; Tallensi; Massa; Azande; Otoro Nuba; Shilluk; Mao; Maasai
Circum-Mediterranean	Wolof; Songhai; Wodaabe Fulani; Hausa; Fur; Kaffa; Konso; Somali; Amhara; Bogo; Kenuzi Nubian; Teda; Tuareg; Riffian; Egyptians (Fellah); Hebrews; Babylonians; Rwala Bedouin; Turks; Gheg (Albanians); Romans; Basques; Irish; Sami (Lapps); Russians; Abkhaz; Armenians; Georgia; Kurd
East Eurasia	Yurak (Samoyed); Basseri; West Punjabi; Gond; Toda; Santal; Uttar Pradesh; Burusho; Kazak; Khalka Mongols; Lolo; Lepcha; Garo; Lakher; Burmese; Lamet; Vietnamese; Rhade (Rade); Khmer; Siamese; Semang; Nicobarese; Andamanese; Vedda; Tanala; Negeri Sembilan; Atayal; Chinese; Manchu; Koreans; Japanese; Ainu; Gilyak; Yukaghir
Insular Pacific	Javanese (Miao); Balinese; Iban; Badjau; Toraja; Tobelorese; Alorese; Tiwi; Aranda; Orokaiva; Kimam; Kapauku; Kwoma; Manus; New Ireland; Trobrianders; Siuai; Tikopia; Pentecost; Mbau Fijians; Ajie; Maori; Marquesans; Western Samoans; Gilbertese; Marshallese; Chuukese; Yapese; Palauans; Ifugao
North America	Ingalik; Aleut; Copper Eskimo; Montagnais; Mi'kmaq; Saulteaux (Ojibwa); Slave; Kaska (Nahane); Eyak; Haida; Bellacoola; Twana; Yurok; Pomo; Yokuts; Paiute (Northern); Klamath; Kutenai; Gros Ventres; Hidatsa; Pawnee; Omaha (Dhegiha); Huron; Creek; Natchez; Comanche; Chiricahua; Zuni; Havasupai; Papago; Huichol; Aztec; Popoluca
South America	Quiché; Miskito (Mosquito); Bribri (Talamanca); Cuna; Goajiro; Haitians; Calinago; Warrau (Warao); Yanomamo; Carib; Saramacca; Munduruku; Cubeo (Tucano); Cayapa; Jivaro; Amahuaca; Inca; Aymara; Siriono; Nambicuara; Trumai; Timbira; Tupinamba; Botocudo; Shavante; Aweikoma; Cayua (Guarani); Lengua; Abipon; Mapuche; Tehuelche; Yaghan

== See also ==
- Human Relations Area Files
