= Cross-Cultural Research =

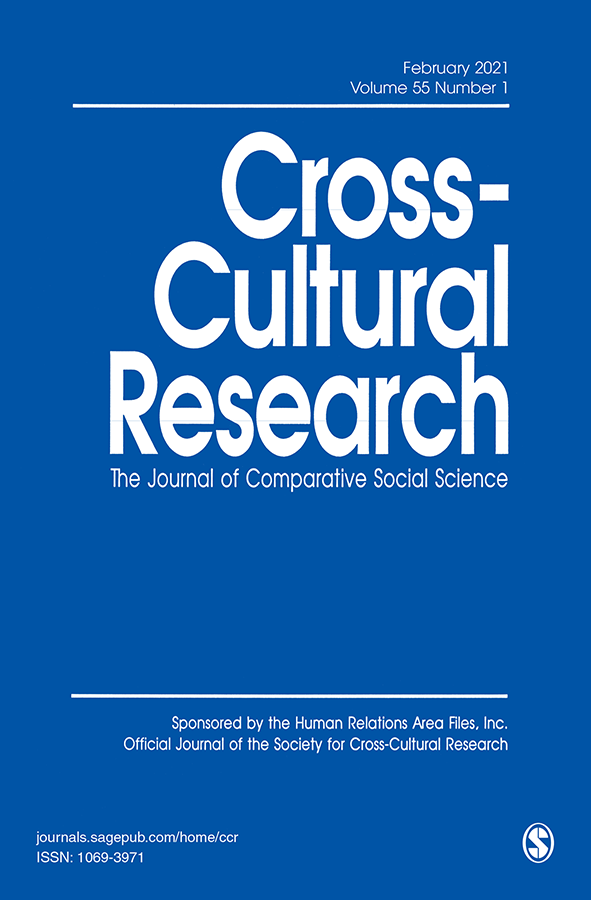
- Discipline: Social Sciences, Interdisciplinary
- Language: English
- Edited by: Carol R. Ember

Publication details
- Former name: Behavior Science Research
- History: 1966–present
- Publisher: SAGE Publications (United Kingdom)
- Frequency: Quarterly
- Impact factor: 0.975 (2017)

Standard abbreviations
- ISO 4: Cross-Cult. Res.

Indexing
- ISSN: 1069-3971 (print); 1552-3578 (web)
- LCCN: 94640704
- OCLC no.: 28013395

Links
- Journal homepage; Online access; Online archive

Cross-Cultural Research (formerly Behavior Science Research) is a peer-reviewed academic journal that publishes papers in the field of Social Sciences. The journal's editor is Carol R. Ember (Human Relations Area Files). The journal has been in publication since 1966 and is currently published by SAGE Publications on behalf of the Society for Cross-Cultural Research.

== Scope ==
Cross-Cultural Research publishes articles that describe cross-cultural and comparative studies in all human sciences. The journal covers topics such as societies, nations and cultures. Cross-Cultural Research focuses on the systematic testing of theories about human societies and behaviour.

== Abstracting and indexing ==
Cross-Cultural Research is abstracted and indexed in, among other databases: SCOPUS, and the Social Sciences Citation Index. According to the Journal Citation Reports, its 2017 impact factor is 0.975, ranking it 56 out of 98 journals in the category "Social Sciences, Interdisciplinary".
