= Laura Betzig =

American anthropologist

Laura L. Betzig
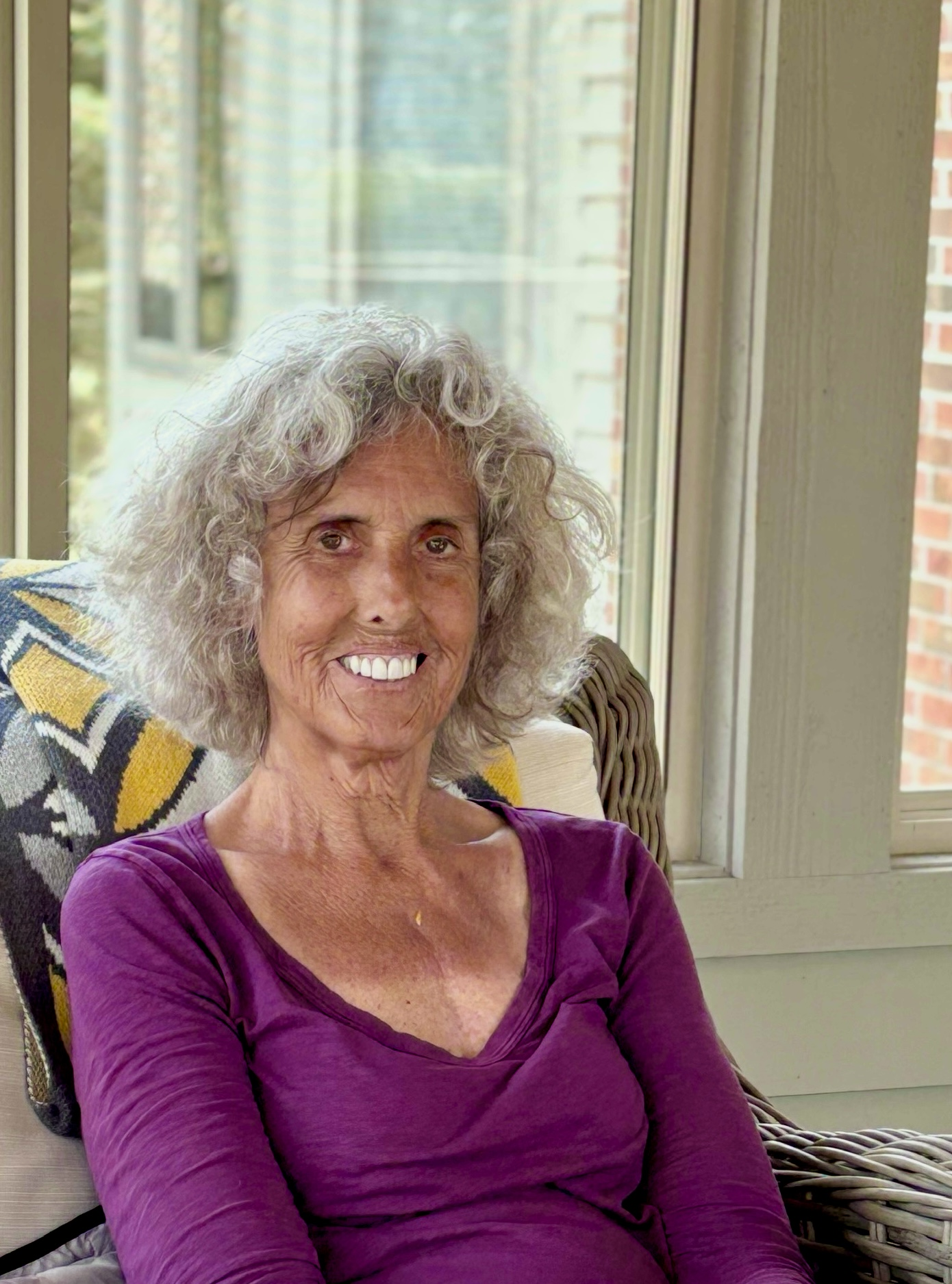
- Betzig in 2025
- Born: Ann Arbor, Michigan, USA

Academic background
- Education: University of Michigan (BA); Northwestern University; (PhD)
- Thesis: Despotism and Differential Reproduction: A Darwinian View of History (1983)
- Doctoral advisor: Napoleon Chagnon

Academic work
- Discipline: Anthropology
- Website: laurabetzig.org

Laura Betzig is an American anthropologist whose work focuses on equality and inequality in historical and contemporary societies.

== Early life and education ==
Betzig is the daughter of Robert Betzig and Helen Hahn. She was born in Ann Arbor, Michigan, went to Pioneer High School, got a BA in psychology from the University of Michigan and a PhD in anthropology from Northwestern University, where she worked with Napoleon Chagnon. She's held research and teaching positions at Northwestern, the University of California and the University of Michigan.

== Research ==
Betzig did fieldwork in the Western Caroline Islands on Ifaluk and Yap, where she found that chiefs get food and labor from commoners, and are able to raise more children as a result. She did cross-cultural work on over a hundred politically-autonomous societies in the Human Relations Area Files where she found, again, that powerful men have access to more women and father more children, and that those differences increase when the powerless lack a way out. For the last couple of decades Betzig has read world history, and documented the decline of political power and sexual access over the last few centuries in the West as emigration increased, first with the Crusades, then with Atlantic crossings.

== Selected publications ==
- Betzig, Laura L. (1986). Despotism and differential reproduction: a Darwinian view of history. New York: Aldine. ISBN 978-0-202-01171-4.
- Betzig, Laura L.; Mulder, Monique Borgerhoff; Turke, Paul, eds. (1988). Human reproductive behaviour: a Darwinian perspective. Cambridge [Cambridgeshire] ; New York: Cambridge University Press. ISBN 978-0-521-32738-1.
- Betzig, Laura (1992). "Roman Polygyny". Ethology and Sociobiology. 13 (5): 309–349. doi:10.1016/1062-3095(92)9008-R. ISSN 1873-6262.
- Betzig, Laura (1995). "Medieval Monogamy". Journal of Family History. 20 (2): 181–216. doi:10.1177/036319909602000204. ISSN 0363-1990.
- Betzig, Laura L., ed. (1997). Human nature: a critical reader. New York: Oxford Univ. Press. ISBN 978-0-19-509865-5.
- Betzig, Laura L. (2014). Means, variances, and ranges in reproductive success: comparative evidence. Evolution and Human Behavior, 33: 309-317. https://doi.org/10.1016/j.evolhumbehav.2011.10.008
- Betzig, Laura L. (2014). Eusociality in history. Human Nature, 25: 80-99. https://pubmed.ncbi.nlm.nih.gov/24402403/
- Betzig, Laura L., ed. (2021). Human history as natural history. Evolutionary Psychology, 19. https://doi.org/10.1177/14747049211066795
- Betzig, Laura L. (2025). Imperial Cult. Encyclopedia of Religious Psychology and Behavior. Springer, Cham. https://doi.org/10.1007/978-3-031-38971-9_2024-1

== Personal life ==
Betzig's brother, Eric Betzig, won the 2014 Nobel Prize in chemistry.
