= George Murdock =

American anthropologist (1897–1985)

George Peter Murdock
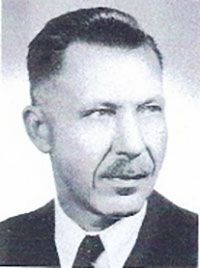
- George Murdock
- Born: May 11, 1897; Meriden, Connecticut, U.S.
- Died: March 29, 1985 (aged 87); Devon, Pennsylvania, U.S.
- Known for: cross-cultural studies; Human Relations Area Files
- Awards: Viking Fund Medal (1949)
- Scientific career
- Fields: Anthropology
- Doctoral advisor: Albert Galloway Keller
- Doctoral students: Ward Goodenough, John Whiting

George Peter Murdock (May 11, 1897 – March 29, 1985) was an American anthropologist who was professor at Yale University and University of Pittsburgh. He is remembered for his empirical approach to ethnological studies and his study of family and kinship structures across differing cultures.

His 1967 Ethnographic Atlas dataset on more than 1,200 pre-industrial societies is influential and frequently used in social science research. He also created the Standard Cross-Cultural Sample with Douglas R. White.

He is also known for his work as an FBI informant on his fellow anthropologists during McCarthyism.

== Early life ==
Born in Meriden, Connecticut, to a family that had farmed there for five generations, Murdock spent many childhood hours working on the family farm and acquired a wide knowledge of traditional, non-mechanized, farming methods. He graduated from Phillips Academy, Andover, in 1915 and earned a BA in American History at Yale University. He then attended Yale

University School, but quit in his second year and took a long trip around the world. This trip, combined with his interest in traditional material culture, and perhaps a bit of inspiration from the popular Yale teacher Albert Galloway Keller, prompted Murdock to study anthropology at Yale. Yale's anthropology program still maintained something of the evolutionary tradition of William Graham Sumner, a quite different emphasis from the historical particularism promulgated by Franz Boas at Columbia. In 1925, he received his doctorate and continued at Yale as a faculty member and chair of the anthropology department.

Even in his earliest writings, Murdock's distinctive approach is apparent. He advocates an empirical approach to anthropology, through the compilation of data from independent cultures, and then testing hypotheses by subjecting the data to the appropriate statistical tests. He also sees himself as a social scientist rather than more narrowly as an anthropologist, and is in constant dialogue with researchers in other disciplines. At Yale, he assembled a team of colleagues and employees in an effort to create a cross-cultural data set.

Believing that a cross-cultural approach would help the U.S. war effort during World War II, Murdock and a few colleagues enlisted in the Navy and wrote handbooks on the cultures of Micronesia, working out of an office at Columbia University. After completing the handbooks, Murdock and his fellow officers were sent to the Pacific as military government officials, serving for nearly a year in the administration of occupied Okinawa. While his pre-war fieldwork had been among the Haida and other indigenous peoples of the Northwest North American coast, Murdock's interests were now focused on Micronesia, and he conducted fieldwork there episodically until the 1960s.

== Yale ==
Murdock joined the faculty of Yale University in 1928. His PhD from the institution was in the field of Sociology, as Yale at that time did not yet have a Department of Anthropology. Murdock taught courses in physical anthropology. In 1931, Yale established an anthropology department and hired Edward Sapir as the chairman. Murdock's sociological and positivist approach to anthropology was at odds with Sapir's Boasian approach to cultural anthropology. Following Sapir's death, Murdock served as chairman of the Department of Anthropology from 1938 until 1960, when he reached the then mandatory retirement age at Yale. However, he was offered the chair of Andrew Mellon Professor of Social Anthropology at the University of Pittsburgh. Leaving his long-time residence at 960 Ridge Road in Hamden, Connecticut, Murdock moved with his wife to 4150 Bigelow Boulevard in Pittsburgh. He taught at the University of Pittsburgh until his retirement in 1973, at which point he moved to the Philadelphia area to be close to his son.

Murdock and his wife had one child, Robert Douglas Murdock. He was born in 1929 and died in 2011. Bob and Jean Murdock had three children, Nancy and Karen (born 1955) and Douglas (born 1959).

For Murdock's war service in World War II, the best source is his own account as published in A Twenty-Five Year Record: Yale College Class of 1919, a class yearbook published in New Haven, Connecticut in 1946. These are Murdock's own recollections, as shared with his classmates in the class of 1919 at Yale:

Before war struck, I was preoccupied with the routines of academic life at Yale—teaching and research with their modest rewards, departmental administration with its headaches, pleasant extra-curricular associations with my colleagues. The principal thrill was to observe (and participate in) the gradual upsurge by which Yale came to assume unquestioned leadership in the social sciences. [...] I wrote a little, imbibed a little, played some tennis, arbitrated a motion picture dispute, and instituted a fairly ambitious project called the Cross-Cultural Survey but dubbed by the New York Times a 'bank of knowledge.' Then came Pearl Harbor, the explosions of which reverberated even in academic halls. Through my chairmanship of the Oceania committee of the National Research Council I helped mobilize the country's anthropologists in the war effort. On the advice of the intelligence experts of the Army and Navy I converted the Cross-Cultural Survey into a fact-gathering organization on the Japanese-held islands of the Pacific. For the Coordinator of Inter-American Affairs I organized and ran the Strategic Index of the Americas, a similar fact-gathering unit. Like so many of my colleagues I spent a good bit of my time running back and forth to Washington. Early in 1943, when the military program in the Pacific began to accelerate, the Navy Department urged me to speed up the research of the Cross-Cultural Survey and made a very generous offer of financial support. They urged me even more strongly, however, to give up my other commitments, to come into the Navy with my associates, and to do the job 'on the inside.' I said, 'Yes,' and within a week received a lieutenant commander's commission. [...] After a month of informal indoctrination at the Office of the Naval Intelligence in Washington I was assigned to the staff of the Naval School of Military Government at Columbia University. Here for fifteen months I managed a research unit at Yale which assembled all available information on the Pacific islands held by the Japanese, operated a second unit at Columbia which organized the information into a series of nine handbooks, and gave a course on the Pacific to military government officers. The last handbook, on the Ryukyu Islands, was (providentially) published just when it was decided to invade Okinawa, and I was sent out to Hawaii to join the staff of the Tenth Army in planning that operation. The planning complete, I was sent out to Okinawa as a military government officer. [...]

For two months, helped by one language officer, my job was to induce or drag the terror-stricken natives out of their mountain fastnesses into the coastal villages where we could house and feed them, give them medical attention, and get them back to a normal peacetime economy. [...] Like millions of my compatriots I have seen at first hand the heroism, cowardice, monotony, resourcefulness, inefficiency, and frustration of which war is compounded. [...] I was transferred to the headquarters of military government for Okinawa and the adjacent islands, being placed in charge first of political affairs and then of all civilian affairs, social and economic as well as political. My principal task was to organize an island-wide civilian council and to establish uniform local government throughout the area, during the course of which I organized and supervised two general elections. During this period my contacts were largely with the political, professional, and business leaders among the Okinawans.

[...] By early October the pull for home was very strong, and I left Okinawa on a task force bound for Norfolk. We stopped en route for three or four days each at Singapore, Colombo, and Cape Town, where we were welcomed by the residents and wined and dined by the Royal Navy. Having completed a circuit of the world, I rejoined my family on December 7.

According to David H. Price, in a chapter of the book Threatening Anthropology, entitled "Hoover's Informer", devoted to Murdock during McCarthyism, Murdock had secretly informed on AAA colleagues to J. Edgar Hoover[ref. Duke University Press, 2004]. Murdock was particularly antagonistic of Boasian cultural anthropology, which he considered to be aligned with communist thought. Murdock was not the only person in his field or at his university to cooperate with intelligence agencies. For much of the 20th century, agencies such as the CIA and the FBI enjoyed a close relationship with American universities. Yale University was especially known (later) as a breeding ground for employees of the agencies. Researchers in anthropology and foreign relations were often debriefed after foreign field trips. Murdock later served as chair of the American Anthropological Association's (AAA's) Committee on Scientific Freedom, established to defend anthropologists from unfair attacks.

In 1948, Murdock decided that his cross-cultural data set would be more valuable were it available to researchers at schools other than Yale. He approached the Social Science Research Council and obtained the funding to establish an inter-university organization, the Human Relations Area Files, with collections maintained at Yale University (Whiting 1986: 684).

== Major works ==
In 1954, Murdock published a list of every known culture, the Outline of World Cultures. In 1957, he published his first cross-cultural data set, the World Ethnographic Sample, consisting of 565 cultures coded for 30 variables. In 1959, despite having no professional experience in Africa, Murdock published Africa: Its peoples and their culture history, a reference book on African ethnic groups heavily reliant on colonial sources that attributed African innovations to diffusion from cultures outside Africa. There is also a list of his other major works:

- Correlations of Matrilineal and Patrilineal Institutions. // G. P. Murdock (ed.) Studies in the Science of Society, New Haven: Yale, 1937.
- Social Structure. New York: The MacMillan Company. 1949.
- Ethnographic Atlas: A Summary. Pittsburgh: The University of Pittsburgh Press. 1967.
- Standard Cross-Cultural Sample // Ethnology 8 (4): 329–369. 1969.
- Atlas of World Cultures. Pittsburgh: The University of Pittsburgh Press. 1981.

== University of Pittsburgh ==
In 1960, Murdock moved to the University of Pittsburgh, where he occupied the Andrew Mellon Chair of Anthropology. In 1971, he was instrumental in founding the Society for Cross-Cultural Research, a scholarly society composed primarily of anthropologists and psychologists (Whiting 1986: 685). Between 1962 and 1967, he published installments of his Ethnographic Atlas in the journal Ethnology—a data set eventually containing almost 1,200 cultures coded for over 100 variables. In 1969, together with Douglas R. White, he developed the Standard Cross-Cultural Sample, consisting of a carefully selected set of 186 well-documented cultures that today are coded for about 2000 variables (Whiting 1986: 685). At the end of his career, he felt "no hesitation in rejecting the validity and utility of the entire body of anthropological theory, including the bulk of my own work...consigning it to the realm of mythology [not] science" as in "anthropology there's virtually no [...] consensus" on "the essential core of its body of theory."

After his retirement from Pitt, Murdock moved to the Philadelphia area to be close to his son and grandchildren. He is buried in a military cemetery, Valley Forge Memorial Gardens, 352 South Gulph Road, King of Prussia, PA.

== Ethnology ==
In 1962, Murdock founded Ethnology An International Journal of Cultural and Social Anthropology, published by the University of Pittsburgh. Publication ended in 2012 owing to a lack of interest from the faculty of the Department of Anthropology at the University of Pittsburgh. Journal staff was released shortly thereafter, and offices were permanently repurposed.

== Contributions ==
Murdock is known most of all for his main sequence theory whose gist was spelled out by him initially as follows: "When any social system which has attained equilibrium begins to change, such change regularly begins with modification of the rule of residence. Alteration in residence rules is followed by development or change in form of descent consistent with residence rules. Finally adaptive changes in kinship terminology follow (Murdock 1949:221–222)."

== See also ==
- List of cultures in the standard cross cultural sample

== Publications ==
- Murdock, George Peter (1949). Social Structure. New York: The MacMillan Company. ISBN 978-0-02-922290-4.
- Murdock, G.P. 1959. Africa: Its peoples and their culture history. New York: McGraw-Hill.
- Murdock, G. P. 1965. Culture and Society: Twenty-Four Essays. Pittsburgh: The University of Pittsburgh Press.
- Murdock, G. P. 1967. Ethnographic Atlas: A Summary. Pittsburgh: The University of Pittsburgh Press.
- Murdock, G. P. (1970). "Kin Term Patterns and their Distribution". Ethnology. 9 (2): 165–207. doi:10.2307/3772782. JSTOR 3772782.
- Murdock, G. P. 1980. 'Theories of Illness: A World Survey'. Pittsburgh: The University of Pittsburgh Press.
- Murdock, G. P. 1981. Atlas of World Cultures. Pittsburgh: The University of Pittsburgh Press.
- Murdock, G. P. 1985. Kin Term Patterns and their Distribution. World Cultures 1(4): stds25.dat, stds25.cod.
- Murdock, G. P.; Morrow, D. O. (1970). "Subsistence Economy and Supportive Practices: Cross-Cultural Codes 1". Ethnology. 9 (3): 302–330. doi:10.2307/3773028. JSTOR 3773028.
- Murdock, G. P.; Provost, C. A. (1973). "Measurement of Cultural Complexity". Ethnology. 12 (4): 379–392. doi:10.2307/3773367. JSTOR 3773367.
- Murdock, G. P., R. Textor, H. Barry III, D. R. White, J. P. Gray, and W. Divale. 1999–2000. Ethnographic Atlas. World Cultures 10(1): 24–136, at01–09.sav; 11(1): ea10.sav (the third electronic version).
- Murdock, G. P.; White, Douglas R (1969). "Standard Cross-Cultural Sample". Ethnology. 8 (4): 329–369. doi:10.2307/3772907. JSTOR 3772907.
- Murdock, G. P.; Wilson, S. F. (1972). "Settlement Patterns and Community Organization: Cross-Cultural Codes 3". Ethnology. 11 (3): 254–295. doi:10.2307/3773219. JSTOR 3773219.
- Murdock, G.P, C.S. Ford, A.E. Hudson, R. Kennedy, L. W. Simmons, and J. W. M. Whiting, Outline of Cultural Materials, New Haven: Institute of Human Relations, 1938.

Chronological listing of books and articles:

- The Evolution of Culture by Julius Lippert (New York: Macmillan, 1931) (as translator and editor)
- "Ethnocentrism", Encyclopedia of the Social Sciences, vol. 5, pp. 613–614 (New York, 1931)
- "The Science of Culture", American Anthropologist, n.s., 34: 200–215 (1932)
- "Lippert, Julius", Encyclopedia of the Social Sciences, vol. 9, pp. 490–491 (1933)
- "The Organization of Inca Society", Scientific Monthly, 38: 231–239 (1934)
- Our Primitive Contemporaries (New York: Macmillan, 1934)
- "Kinship and Social Behavior among the Haida", American Anthropologist, n.s., 36: 355–385 (1934)
- "A Racial Primer", Bulletin of the Associates in the Science of Society, 4.4: 1–3 (1935)
- "The Witoto Kinship System", American Anthropologist, n.s., 38: 525–527 (1936)
- "Rank and Potlatch among the Haida", Yale University Publications in Anthropology, no. 13, pp. 1–20 (1936)
- Studies in the Science of Society (New Haven: Yale, 1937) (editor)
- "Correlations of Matrilineal and Patrilineal Institutions". In G. P. Murdock (ed.) Studies in the Science of Society, New Haven: Yale, 1937.
- "Comparative Data on the Division of Labor by Sex", Social Forces, 15: 551–553 (1937)
- "Anthropological Glossary", Southwestern Monuments, pp. 77–88, 268–274 (1938)
- "Notes on the Tenino, Molala, and Paiute of Oregon", American Anthropologist, n.s., 40: 395–402 (1938)
- "Guia para la investigacion etnologica", trans. by Radames A. Altieri, Universidad Nacional de Tucuman, Notas del Instituto de Antropologia, I, ii, 21–131, Tucuman, 1939 (coauthor with C.S. Ford, A. E. Hudson, R. Kennedy, L. W. Simmons, and J. W. M. Whiting)
- "The Cross-Cultural Survey", American Sociological Review, 5: 361–370, 1940
- "Double Descent", American Anthropologist, 42:555–561, 1940.
- "Ethnographic Bibliography of North America", Yale Anthropological Studies, I, pp. 1–169, 1941
- "Anthropology and Human Relations", Sociometry, 4: 140–149, 1941.
- "Bronislaw Malinowski", Yale Law Journal, 51: 1235–1236, 1942.
- "The Yale Survey of South American Ethnology", Proceedings of the Eighth American Scientific Congress, 1940, 2: 199–202. Washington, 1942.
- "Marshall Islands", Navy Department (OPNAV 50E), Military Government Handbook, no. 1, pp. 1–113. Washington, 1943 (coauthor with C. S. Ford and J. W. M. Whiting)
- "Bronislaw Malinowski", American Anthropologist, n.s., 45: 441–451, 1943.
- "East Caroline Islands", Navy Department (OPNAV 50E), Civil Affairs Handbook, no. 5, pp. 1–213. Washington, 1944. (coauthor with C. S. Ford and J. W. M. Whiting)
- "West Caroline Islands", Navy Department (OPNAV 50E), Civil Affairs Handbook, no. 7, pp. 1–222, Washington, 1944. (coauthor with C.S. Ford and J. W. M. Whiting)
- "Mandated Marianas Islands", Navy Department (OPNAV 50E), Civil Affairs Handbook, no. 8, pp. 1–205, Washington, 1944. (coauthor with C.S. Ford and J.W.M. Whiting)
- "Marshall Islands Statistical Supplement", Navy Department (OPNAV 50E), Civil Affairs Handbook, no. 1S, pp. 1–38, Washington, 1944 (coauthor with C.S. Ford and J. W. M. Whiting)
- "Izu and Bonin Islands", Navy Department (OPNAV 50E), Civil Affairs Handbook, no. 9, pp. 1–188. Washington, 1944 (coauthor with C.S. Ford and J.W. M. Whiting)
- "Ryukyu (Loochoo) Islands", Navy Department (OPNAV 13), Civil Affairs Handbook, no. 31, pp. 1–334. Washington, 1944. (coauthor with C. S. Ford and J. W. M. Whiting)
- "The Common Denominator of Cultures", in Ralph Linton (ed.), The Science of Man in the World Crisis, New York: Columbia, 1945, pp. 123–142.
- Nuestros contemporaneos primitivos (Spanish translation of Our Primitive Contemporaries), trans. by Teodoro Ortiz. Mexico: Fondo de Cultura Economica, 1945.
- "Outline of Cultural Materials", rev. ed. Yale Anthropological Studies, II, pp, 1–56. New Haven, 1945 (coauthor with C. S. Ford, A. E. Hudson, R. Kennedy, L. W. Simmons, and J. W. M. Whiting)
- "Bifurcate Merging: A Test of Five Theories", American Anthropologist, n.s. 49: 56–68, 1947.
- "Family Universals", Marriage and Family Living, 9:39, 1947.
