= Cross-cultural studies =

Specialization in anthropology and sister sciences

Cross-cultural studies, sometimes called holocultural studies or comparative studies, is a specialization in anthropology and sister sciences such as sociology, psychology, economics, political science that uses field data from many societies through comparative research to examine the scope of human behavior and test hypotheses about human behavior and culture.

Cross-cultural studies is the third form of cross-cultural comparisons. The first is comparison of case studies, the second is controlled comparison among variants of a common derivation, and the third is comparison within a sample of cases. Unlike comparative studies, which examines similar characteristics of a few societies, cross-cultural studies uses a sufficiently large sample so that statistical analysis can be made to show relationships or lack of relationships between the traits in question. These studies are surveys of ethnographic data, or involve qualitative data collection. They can also use mixed methods.

Cross-cultural studies are applied widely in the social sciences, particularly in cultural anthropology and psychology.

== History ==
The first cross-cultural studies were carried out by 19th-century anthropologists such as Edward Burnett Tylor and Lewis H. Morgan. One of Edward Tylor's first studies gave rise to the central statistical issue of cross-cultural studies: phylogenetic autocorrelation also known as Galton's problem. In the recent decades historians and particularly historians of science started looking at the mechanism and networks by which knowledge, ideas, skills, instruments and books moved across cultures, generating new and fresh concepts concerning the order of things in nature. In Cross-Cultural Scientific Exchanges in the Eastern Mediterranean 1560–1660 Avner Ben-Zaken has argued that cross-cultural exchanges take place at a cultural hazy locus where the margins of one culture overlaps the other, creating a "mutually embraced zone" where exchanges take place on mundane ways. From such a stimulating zone, ideas, styles, instruments and practices move onward to the cultural centers, urging them to renew and update cultural notions.

== Modern era ==
The modern era of cross-cultural studies began with George Murdock (1949), who set up a number of foundational data sets, including the Human Relations Area Files, and the Ethnographic Atlas. Together with Douglas R. White, he developed the widely-used Standard Cross-Cultural Sample, which is currently maintained by the open access electronic journal World Cultures.

Hofstede's cultural dimensions theory is a framework for cross-cultural communication, developed by Geert Hofstede in the 1970s. It describes the effects of a society's culture on the values of its members, and how these values relate to behavior, using a structure derived from factor analysis. The original theory proposed four dimensions along which cultural values could be analyzed: individualism-collectivism; uncertainty avoidance; power distance (strength of social hierarchy) and masculinity-femininity (task-orientation versus person-orientation). It has been refined several times since then.

With the widespread access of people to the Internet and the high influence of online social networks on daily life, users behavior in these websites have become a new resource to perform cross-cultural and comparative studies. A study on Twitter examined the usage of emoticons from users of 78 countries and found a positive correlation between individualism-collectivism dimension of Hofstede's cultural dimensions theory and people's use of mouth-oriented emoticons. Another user experience study on the usage of smileys from users of 12 countries showed that emoji-based scales may ease the challenges related to translation and implementation for brief cross-cultural surveys.

== See also ==
- Comparative cultural studies
- Cross-cultural
- Cross-cultural capital
- Cross-cultural communication
- Cross-cultural psychiatry
- Cross-cultural psychology
- Cultural bias
- Cultural relativism
- Ethnocentrism
- Human Relations Area Files
- Kluckhohn and Strodtbeck's values orientation theory
- Standard cross-cultural sample
- Hofstede's cultural dimensions theory

== Bibliography ==
- Ember, Carol R., and Melvin Ember. 1998. Cross-Cultural Research. Handbook of Methods in Cultural Anthropology / Ed. by H. R. Bernard, pp. 647–90. Walnut Creek, CA: AltaMira Press.
- Ember, Carol R., and Melvin Ember. 2001. Cross-Cultural Research Methods. Lanham, MD: AltaMira Press.
- Korotayev, Andrey, World Religions and Social Evolution of the Old World Oikumene Civilizations: A Cross-Cultural Perspective. Lewiston, NY: Edwin Mellen Press. ISBN 0-7734-6310-0
- Franco, F.M., and D. Narasimhan. 2009. Plant names and uses as indicators of traditional knowledge. Indian Journal of Traditional Knowledge.
- Franco, F.M., D. Narasimhan and W. Stanley. 2008. Relationship between four tribal communities and their natural resources in the Koraput region. Ethnobotany Research and Applications, Vol. 6.
- Levinson, David, and Martin J. Malone. 1980. Toward Explaining Human Culture: A Critical Review of the Findings of Worldwide Cross-Cultural Research. New Haven, CT: HRAF Press.
- Macfarlane, Alan. 2004. To Contrast and Compare, pp. 94–111, in Methodology and Fieldwork, edited by Vinay Kumar Srivastava. Delhi: Oxford University Press.
- de Munck V. Cultural Units in Cross-Cultural Research // Ethnology 39/4 (2000): 335–348.
- Murdock, George P. 1949. Social Structure. New York: Macmillan.
- Murdock, George P. 1967. Ethnographic Atlas: A Summary. Pittsburgh: The University of Pittsburgh Prsrtjh sdxthgn fdty a45tesjtukcn bess.
- Murdock, George P. 1970. Kin Term Patterns and their Distribution. Ethnology 9: 165–207.
- Murdock, George P. 1981. Atlas of World Cultures. Pittsburgh: The University of Pittsburgh Press.
- Murdock, George P., and Douglas R. White. 1969. Standard Cross-Cultural Sample. Ethnology 8:329–369.
- Whiting, John W.M. 1986. ''George Peter Murdock, (1897–1985)''. American Anthropologist. 88(3): 682–686.
