= Human Relations Area Files =

International nonprofit membership organization

The Human Relations Area Files, Inc. (HRAF), located in New Haven, Connecticut, US, is an international nonprofit membership organization with over 500 member institutions in more than 20 countries. A financially autonomous research agency based at Yale University since 1949, its mission is to promote understanding of cultural diversity and commonality in the past and present. To accomplish this mission, the Human Relations Area Files produces scholarly resources and infrastructure for research, teaching and learning, and supports and conducts original research on cross-cultural variation.

HRAF produces two flagship databases accessible by its members: eHRAF World Cultures and eHRAF Archaeology. HRAF also sponsors and edits the quarterly journal, Cross-Cultural Research: The Journal of Comparative Social Science. Expanded and updated annually, eHRAF World Cultures includes ethnographic materials on cultures, past and present, all over the world. Also expanding annually, eHRAF Archaeology covers major archaeological traditions and many more sub-traditions and sites around the world. Documents in both eHRAF databases are subject-indexed at the paragraph level by HRAF anthropologists.

In addition, HRAF offers several open-access resources. Explaining Human Culture is a database with standardized summaries that provides a searchable way for researchers to find out what has been learned from previous cross-cultural research about cultural universals and differences. Explaining Human Culture also features topical articles on cross-cultural insights (e.g., cross-cultural perspectives on childhood, dwellings, and sports). Introducing Cross-Cultural Research is a series of PDFs constituting a "crash course" in cross-cultural methods. Finally, Teaching eHRAF is a library of teaching exercises and syllabi (many designed by professors at member institutions) that use eHRAF to explore cultural diversity.

== History ==
On February 26, 1949, delegates from Harvard University, the University of Pennsylvania, the University of Oklahoma, the University of Washington, and Yale University met in New Haven, Connecticut to pledge their membership in a new nonprofit research consortium to be based at Yale. The plan was to "develop and distribute files of organized information related to human societies and cultures." The name of the new inter-university corporation was the Human Relations Area Files, Inc. (HRAF). It is an ever-growing catalogue of cross-indexed ethnographic data, sorted and filed by geographic location and cultural characteristics.

The name came from the Institute of Human Relations, an interdisciplinary program at Yale at the time. The Institute of Human Relations had sponsored HRAF's precursor, the Cross-Cultural Survey (see George Peter Murdock), as part of an effort to develop an integrated science of human behavior and culture. On May 7, 1949, the HRAF consortium was formally established with three additional universities—the University of Chicago, the University of North Carolina, and the University of Southern California. As of 2018, there are 21 sponsoring members and hundreds of associate members. The HRAF Collection of Ethnography (the pre-electronic precursor to eHRAF World Cultures) was originally distributed as paper files. From the early 1960s until 1994, most members received their annual installments on microfiche. Since 1994, the annual installments have been in electronic form, first on CD-ROM and later online.

== Distinctiveness of the databases ==
The HRAF databases were developed to foster comparative research on humans in all their variety, from small-scale hunting and gathering societies to complex states. This provides a contrast to databases that focus solely on countries. In addition, the databases, in contrast to bibliographic ones that provide pointers to materials, actually contain those materials. Searching across cultures for particular kinds of information is facilitated by the unique ethnographic subject classification system that HRAF has developed and refined over more than 60 years, the Outline of Cultural Materials or OCM. In contrast to most subject-indexing which is done at the document level, HRAF has its indexers subject index at the paragraph level.

For example, suppose users are interested in assessing the degree to which various cultures depend on stored foods. They would discover that there is an index subject category called "Preservation and Storage of Food" (OCM 251). Searching by that subject category would retrieve all of the paragraphs that describe dried, smoked, pickled, refrigerated, frozen, and canned foods, and whatever other ways the people of the given culture store or preserve food. The analysts at HRAF, who have read through and indexed every page of every text that goes into the HRAF files, have made it possible to find the relevant information, even when the user does not know in advance which particular words (including untranslated native words) the original authors may have used. It is also possible to search the eHRAF texts by the words that actually appear in them. The most efficient searches may use a combination of OCM subject categories and keywords, using Boolean operators. But, if there is no standard vocabulary for the subject matter of interest, the user can always use the OCM subject categories to get to the particular kinds of information sought.

== Uses of the eHRAF collections ==
The eHRAF Collections can be used for teaching and research on any aspect of cultural and social life. The collections are primarily organized by major geographical region, and then by culture or archaeological tradition, so researchers can access information about particular cultures, particular regions of the world, or do a worldwide or regional cross-cultural comparison. See Cross-cultural studies.

=== Cross-cultural research ===
Although the HRAF collections can be used for many purposes, they were primarily designed to enable researchers to find information quickly across a broad range of cultures so that societies could be compared on particular dimensions of variation. Most cross-cultural researchers test hypotheses on worldwide samples with the aim of arriving at valid generalizations about human behavior and social and cultural life. But smaller-scale comparisons are also possible, such as regional comparisons, or comparisons of particular types of societies (such as hunter-gatherers or prehistoric states). While passages in ethnographies or archaeological reports are readily found using HRAF's subject-indexing system, there are few pre-coded variables in eHRAF. Therefore, researchers need to develop nominal, ordinal, or interval coding scales to measure the particular types of variation.

For example, the subject category "Techniques of Socialization" (OCM 861) will find passages that deal with cultural ideas about childtraining or general methods of discipline, but coding schemes need to be developed to measure dimensions of variation, such as "degree to which corporal punishment is employed," "degree to which threatening is employed," or "degree to which children are praised." It is not difficult, after a little practice, to develop ordinal scales that can allow for the coding of words into quantitative measures, and once that is done it is easy to use available software to test hypotheses, and compare, combine, and model the results. The indexed texts in HRAF are also amenable to qualitative cross-cultural comparisons.

The HRAF databases were built somewhat opportunistically, so for hypothesis-testing research it is best to use a sub-sample within eHRAF that was designed to be representative. There are two main representative sub-samples within eHRAF World Cultures and one within eHRAF Archaeology. eHRAF World Cultures contains 1) a 60-culture sample known as the Probability Sample Files (PSF); and 2) most of the societies in the Standard Cross-Cultural Sample (expected to be completely included by 2020). Researchers can use the PSF to test hypotheses on a fairly large and unbiased sample of the world's cultures. Because the PSF sample includes only one culture (that met data quality criteria) randomly selected from each of 60 macro-culture areas around the world, correlations and other statistical results are likely to be trustworthy and functional, not due to duplications in the sample because of random diffusion or common ancestry. From 2000 on, eHRAF World Cultures has included additional randomly selected cases that may be added to the PSF for scientific sampling (called the Simple Random Sample). The Standard Cross-Cultural Sample of 186 societies also stratified the world into culture areas and then chose one society per culture area, but it differs from the PSF in that 200 culture areas were used and the choice of a society was based on judgmental rather than random selection. eHRAF Archaeology includes an annually-growing Simple Random Sample (SRS) of archaeological traditions drawn from the Outline Of Archaeological Traditions that can be used for hypothesis-testing. In addition, eHRAF Archaeology contains complete tradition sequences.

The results of cross-cultural studies using ethnography are usually correlational. But it would be informative to go beyond cross-sectional validation, in particular to see if temporal sequences validate causal theories. The eHRAF World Cultures database often contains information from more than one time period, so while not often done, it is possible to measure ethnographic cases for two different points in time. But for many questions about cultural evolution, the ethnographic (or ethnohistorical) record is not likely to provide enough of the necessary time-series data for statistical analysis.

This dilemma particularly applies to the classical questions about human cultural evolution, including the emergence of agriculture, the rise of social inequality and the first cities, and the origins of the state. Investigators of cultural evolution can use the eHRAF World Cultures and eHRAF Archaeology databases to study and model causal sequences. Cross-cultural (comparative ethnographic) studies can provide archaeological indicators of cultural and other (e.g., physical and social environmental) features. Using those indicators, researchers could test many causal ideas about the major events in cultural evolution and devolution on the time-series data in the archaeological record. Thus, the data in eHRAF Archaeology can allow researchers to determine whether evolutionary patterns in one region are repeated in others, and to determine whether the presumed causal factors in one region are important, and antecedent, in other world regions too. Comparative ethnography can tell us about cultural statics, what predicts cross-cultural variation in recent times. Comparative archaeology can tell us about cultural dynamics, what comes first and what follows what in prehistory.

== See also ==
- Coding (social sciences)
- Standard cross-cultural sample
- Transcription (linguistics)
