= Hofstede's cultural dimensions theory =

Framework for cross-cultural communication

Hofstede's cultural dimensions theory is a framework for cross-cultural psychology, developed by Geert Hofstede. It shows the effects of a society's culture on the values of its members, and how these values relate to behavior, using a structure derived from factor analysis.

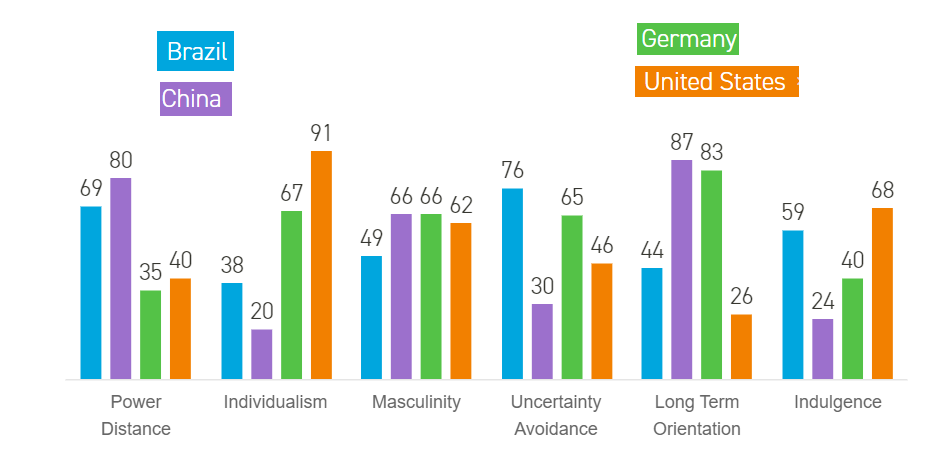
Hofstede's cultural dimensions theory. Comparison of 4 countries: US, China, Germany, and Brazil in all 6 dimensions of the model.

Hofstede developed his original model as a result of using factor analysis to examine the results of a worldwide survey of employee values by International Business Machines between 1967 and 1973. It has been refined since. The original theory proposed four dimensions along which cultural values could be analyzed: individualism-collectivism; uncertainty avoidance; power distance (strength of social hierarchy) and masculinity-femininity (task-orientation versus person-orientation). The Hofstede Cultural Dimensions factor analysis is based on extensive cultural preferences research conducted by Gert Jan Hofstede and his research teams. Hofstede based his research on national cultural preferences rather than individual cultural preferences. Hofstede's model includes six key dimensions for comparing national cultures: the Power Distance Index (PDI), Individualism vs. Collectivism (IDV), Masculinity vs. Femininity (MAS), the Uncertainty Avoidance Index (UAI), Long-Term vs. Short-Term Orientation (LTO), and Indulgence vs. Restraint (IVR). Each dimension highlights how cultures differ in terms of authority, social relationships, achievement focus, tolerance for uncertainty, time orientation, and levels of self-control. The PDI describes the degree to which authority is accepted and followed. The IDV measures the extent to which people look out for each other as a team or look out for themselves as an individual. MAS represents specific values that a society values. The UAI describes to what extent nations avoid the unknown. LTO expresses how societies either prioritize traditions or seek for the modern in their dealings with the present and the future. The IVR index is a comparison between a country's willingness to wait for long-term benefits by holding off on instant gratification, or preferences to no restraints on enjoying life at the present.

Independent research in Hong Kong led Hofstede to add a fifth dimension, long-term orientation, to cover aspects of values not discussed in the original paradigm. In 2010, Hofstede added a sixth dimension, indulgence versus self-restraint. Hofstede's work established a major research tradition in cross-cultural psychology and has also been drawn upon by researchers and consultants in many fields relating to international business and communication. The theory has been widely used in several fields as a paradigm for research, particularly in cross-cultural psychology, international management, and cross-cultural communication. It continues to be a major resource in cross-cultural fields.

== History ==
In 1965 Hofstede founded the personnel research department of IBM Europe (which he managed until 1971). Between 1967 and 1973, he executed a large survey study regarding national values differences across the worldwide subsidiaries of this multinational corporation: he compared the answers of 117,000 IBM matched employees samples on the same attitude survey in different countries. He first focused his research on the 40 largest countries, and then extended it to 50 countries and 3 regions, "at that time probably the largest matched-sample cross-national database available anywhere." The theory was one of the first quantifiable theories that could be used to explain observed differences between cultures.

This initial analysis identified systematic differences in national cultures on four primary dimensions: power distance (PDI), individualism (IDV), uncertainty avoidance (UAI) and masculinity (MAS), which are described below. As Hofstede explains on his academic website, these dimensions regard "four anthropological problem areas (Anthropological theories of value attempt to expand on the traditional theories of value used by economists or ethicists. They are often broader in scope than the theories of value of Adam Smith, David Ricardo, John Stuart Mill, Karl Marx, etc. usually including sociological, political, institutional, etc.) that different national societies handle differently: ways of coping with inequality, ways of coping with uncertainty, the relationship of the individual with her or his primary group, and the emotional implications of having been born as a girl or as a boy". Geert Hofstede created the cultural dimensions theory in 1980. In 1984 he published Culture's Consequences, a book which combines the statistical analysis from the survey research with his personal experiences.

In order to confirm the early results from the IBM study and to extend them to a variety of populations, six subsequent cross-national studies were successfully conducted between 1990 and 2002. Covering between 14 and 28 countries each, the samples included commercial airline pilots, students, civil service managers, 'up-market' consumers and 'elites'. The combined research established value scores on the four dimensions for a total of 76 countries and regions.

In 1991 Michael Harris Bond and colleagues conducted a study among students in 23 countries, using a survey instrument developed with Chinese employees and managers. The results from this study led Hofstede to add a new fifth dimension to his model: long-term orientation (LTO), initially called Confucian dynamism. In 2010, the scores for this dimension were extended to 93 countries thanks to the research of Michael Minkov, who used data from the recent World Values Survey. Further research has refined some of the original dimensions, and introduced the difference between country-level and individual-level data in analysis.

Finally, Minkov's World Values Survey data analysis of 93 representative samples of national populations also led Geert Hofstede to identify a sixth last dimension: indulgence versus restraint.

== Dimensions of national cultures ==
- Power distance index (PDI): The power distance index is defined as "the extent to which the less powerful members of organizations and institutions (like the family) accept and expect that power is distributed unequally". A higher degree of the Index indicates that hierarchy is clearly established and executed in society, without doubt or reason. A lower degree of the Index signifies that people question authority and attempt to distribute power.
- Individualism vs. collectivism (IDV): This index explores the "degree to which people in a society are integrated into groups". Individualistic societies have loose ties that often only relate an individual to his/her immediate family. They emphasize the "I" versus the "we". Its counterpart, collectivism, describes a society in which tightly integrated relationships tie extended families and others into in-groups. These in-groups are laced with undoubted loyalty and support each other when a conflict arises with another in-group.
- Uncertainty avoidance (UAI): The uncertainty avoidance index is defined as "a society's tolerance for ambiguity", in which people embrace or avert an event of something unexpected, unknown, or away from the status quo. Societies that score a high degree in this index opt for stiff codes of behavior, guidelines, laws, and generally rely on absolute truth, or the belief that one lone truth dictates everything and that people know what it is. A lower degree in this index shows more acceptance of differing thoughts or ideas. Society tends to impose fewer regulations, ambiguity is more accustomed to, and the environment is more free-flowing.
- Motivation towards Achievement and Success (formerly masculinity vs. femininity). MAS: In this dimension, masculinity is defined as "a preference in society for achievement, heroism, assertiveness, and material rewards for success." Its counterpart represents "a preference for cooperation, modesty, caring for the weak, and quality of life." Women in the respective societies tend to display different values. In feminine societies, they share modest and caring views equally with men. In more masculine societies, women are somewhat assertive and competitive, but notably less than men. In other words, they still recognize a gap between male and female values. This dimension is frequently viewed as taboo in highly masculine societies. The name of this dimension was changed by Hofstede Insights around late 2023 or early 2024 as "not timely anymore" as it "caused discomfort among some of our customers and website visitors for treating gender as a binary concept".
- Long-term orientation vs. short-term orientation (LTO): This dimension associates the connection of the past with the current and future actions/challenges. A lower degree of this index (short-term) indicates that traditions are honored and kept, while steadfastness is valued. Societies with a high degree in this index (long-term) view adaptation and circumstantial, pragmatic problem-solving as a necessity. A poor country that is short-term oriented usually has little to no economic development, while long-term oriented countries continue to develop to a level of prosperity.
- Indulgence vs. restraint (IVR): This dimension refers to the degree of freedom that societal norms give to citizens in fulfilling their human desires. Indulgence is defined as "a society that allows relatively free gratification of basic and natural human desires related to enjoying life and having fun". Its counterpart is defined as "a society that controls gratification of needs and regulates it by means of strict social norms".

=== Differences between cultures on the values dimensions ===
Putting together national scores (from 1 for the lowest to 100 for the highest), Hofstede's six-dimensions model allows international comparison between cultures, also called comparative research:

- Power distance index shows very high scores for Latin American and Asian countries, African areas and the Arab world. On the other hand, Germanic countries, including Anglophone countries, have a lower power distance (only 11 for Austria and 18 for Denmark).

For example, the United States has a 40 on the cultural scale of Hofstede's analysis. Compared to Guatemala where the power distance is very high (95) and Austria where it is very low (11), the United States is in the middle.

- Germany scores a high UAI (65) and Belgium even more (94) compared to Sweden (29) or Denmark (23) despite their geographic proximity. However, few countries have very low UAI.
- Motivation towards Achievement & Success is extremely low in Nordic countries: Norway scores 8 and Sweden only 5. In contrast, MAS is very high in Japan (95), and in European countries like Hungary, Austria and Switzerland influenced by German culture. In the Anglo world, MAS scores are relatively high with 66 for the United Kingdom for example. Latin American countries present contrasting scores: for example Venezuela has a 73-point score whereas Chile's is only 28.
- High long-term orientation scores are typically found in East Asia, with South Korea having the highest possible score of 100, Taiwan 93 and Japan 88. They are moderate in Eastern and Western Europe, and low in the Anglo countries, Africa and in Latin America. However, there is less data about this dimension.
- Individualism (IDV) is highest in the US (91), Australia (90), and Great Britain (89). Contrarily Hong Kong and Serbia (25), Malaysia (26), and Portugal (27) are considered to be collectivists.
- There is even less data about the sixth dimension. Indulgence scores are highest in Latin America, parts of Africa, the Anglo world and Nordic Europe; restraint is mostly found in East Asia and Eastern Europe.

=== Correlations of values with other country differences ===
Researchers have grouped some countries together by comparing countries' value scores with other country difference such as geographical proximity, shared language, related historical background, similar religious beliefs and practices, common philosophical influences, and identical political systems; in other words, everything which is implied by the definition of a nation's culture. For example, low power distance is associated with consultative political practices and income equity, whereas high power distance is correlated with unequal income distribution, as well as bribery and corruption in domestic politics. Individualism is positively correlated with social mobility, national wealth, or the quality of government. As a country becomes richer, its culture becomes more individualistic.

Another example of correlation was drawn by the Sigma Two Group in 2003, who presented a correlation between countries' cultural dimensions and their predominant religion. "Predominant" is here defined as over 50% of the country's population identifying as a member of that religion, based on the World Factbook 2002. On average, predominantly Catholic countries show very high uncertainty avoidance, relatively high power distance, moderate masculinity and relatively low individualism, whereas predominantly atheist countries (not to be confused with Atheism) have low uncertainty avoidance, very high power distance, moderate masculinity, and very low individualism. Coelho (2011) found inverse correlations between rates of specific kinds of innovation in manufacturing companies and the percentage of large companies per country as well as the employment of a specific kind of manufacturing strategy.

The quantification of cultural dimensions enables people to make cross-regional comparisons and form an image of the differences between not just countries but entire regions. For example, the cultural model of the Mediterranean countries is dominated by high levels of acceptance of inequalities, with uncertainty aversion influencing their choices. With regard to individualism, Mediterranean countries tend to be characterized by moderate levels of individualistic behavior. The same applies to masculinity. Future orientation places Mediterranean countries in a middle ranking, and they show a preference for indulgence values.

Power distance index is positively correlated with the ratio of companies with process innovation only over the companies with any of the three types of innovation considered in the country (determinant of correlation: 28%). Hence in countries with higher power distance, innovative manufacturing companies are somewhat more bound to resort to process innovations. Power distance index occurs more often in technological societies with a representative government and a good basic education system, whereas high PDI is associated with economic inequality.

== Applications of the model ==
=== Practical applications of theory ===
Geert Hofstede is perhaps the best known sociologist of culture and anthropologist in the context of applications for understanding international business. Many articles and research papers refer to his publications, with over 26,000 citations to his 2001 book Culture's Consequences: Comparing Values, Behaviors, Institutions and Organizations Across Nations (which is an updated version of his first publication). The five dimensions model is widely used in many domains of human social life, and particularly in the field of business. Practical applications were developed almost immediately.

==== International communication ====
In business it is commonly agreed that communication is one of the primary concerns. So, for professionals who work internationally; people who interact daily with other people from different countries within their company or with other companies abroad; Hofstede's model gives insights into other cultures. In fact, cross-cultural communication requires being aware of cultural differences because what may be considered perfectly acceptable and natural in one country, can be confusing or even offensive in another. All the levels in communication are affected by cultural dimensions: verbals (words and language itself), non-verbals (body language, gestures) and etiquette do's and don'ts (clothing, gift-giving, dining, customs and protocol). This is also valid for written communication, as explained in William Wardrobe's essay Beyond Hofstede: Cultural applications for communication with Latin American Businesses.

==== International negotiation ====
In international negotiations, communication style, expectation, issue ranking and goals will change according to the negotiators' countries of origin. If applied properly, an understanding of cultural dimensions should increase success in negotiations and reduce frustration and conflicts. For example, in a negotiation between Chinese and Canadians, the Canadian negotiators may want to reach an agreement and sign a contract, whereas the Chinese negotiators may want to spend more time for non-business activities, small-talk and hospitality with preferences for protocol and form in order to first establish the relationship.

"When negotiating in Western countries, the objective is to work toward a target of mutual understanding and agreement and 'shake-hands' when that agreement is reached – a cultural signal of the end of negotiations and the start of 'working together'. In Middle Eastern countries much negotiation takes place leading into the 'agreement', signified by shaking hands. However, the deal is not complete in the Middle Eastern culture. In fact, it is a cultural sign that 'serious' negotiations are just beginning."

==== International management ====
These considerations are also true in international management and cross-cultural leadership. Decisions taken have to be based on the country's customs and values.

When working in international companies, managers may provide training to their employees to make them sensitive to cultural differences, develop nuanced business practices, with protocols across countries. Hofstede's dimensions offer guidelines for defining culturally acceptable approaches to corporate organizations.

Applying Hofstede's dimensions of culture, one can tailor management strategies in international settings by recognizing the spectrum of individualism and collectivism. For example, in collectivist societies, leaders who promote team unity and collective effort are likely to see better performance. In contrast, management that values and encourages individual initiative and responsibility aligns well with individualistic cultures, leading to greater effectiveness in those settings.

As a part of the public domain, Geert Hofstede's work is used by numerous consultancies worldwide.

==== International marketing ====
The six-dimension model is very useful in international marketing because it defines national values not only in business context but in general. Marieke de Mooij has studied the application of Hofstede's findings in the field of global branding, advertising strategy and consumer behavior. As companies try to adapt their products and services to local habits and preferences they have to understand the specificity of their market.

For example, if you want to market cars in a country where the uncertainty avoidance is high, you should emphasize their safety, whereas in other countries you may base your advertisement on the social image they give you. Cell phone marketing is another interesting example of the application of Hofstede's model for cultural differences: if you want to advertise cell phones in China, you may show a collective experience whereas in the United States you may show how an individual uses it to save time and money. The variety of application of Hofstede's abstract theory is so wide that it has even been translated in the field of web designing in which you have to adapt to national preferences according to cultures' values.

Incorporating Hofstede's Uncertainty Avoidance Index (UAI) into international marketing, particularly in the travel and tourism sector, helps in crafting culturally congruent strategies. For regions exhibiting high UAI, tourism promotions could focus on structured travel experiences like guided tours and fixed itineraries to appeal to the local preference for predictability. Conversely, in low UAI cultures, advertisements may showcase more spontaneous and flexible travel options, catering to their comfort with ambiguity. This application of Hofstede's research ensures that marketing messages align with cultural norms, potentially increasing their effectiveness.

==== International transportation ====
The application of Hofstede's cultural dimensions extends to the field of international transportation, influencing how transportation systems cater to urban travel behaviors. The Individualism/Collectivism scale is particularly insightful in this context. In societies that lean towards individualism, there is a tendency to design urban planning frameworks that favor the use of personal vehicles, often resulting in the development of expansive road networks. On the other hand, collectivist societies tend to prioritize the establishment of public transportation networks that facilitate group travel. By incorporating an understanding of these cultural tendencies, urban planners and policymakers can create transportation infrastructures that are not only efficient but also culturally attuned. This approach is instrumental for cities aiming to enhance traffic flow and mitigate congestion, ensuring that the transportation systems reflect the societal values and preferences.

== Limitations of Hofstede's model ==
Even though Hofstede's model is generally accepted as the most comprehensive framework of national cultures' values by those studying business culture, its validity and its limitations have been extensively criticized. One prominent critique is by McSweeney. Ailon deconstructed Hofstede's book Culture's Consequences by mirroring it against its own assumptions and logic. Ailon finds inconsistencies at the level of both theory and methodology and cautions against an uncritical reading of Hofstede's cultural dimensions. Hofstede responded to these critiques, generating a back-and-forth.

=== Questionable choice of national level ===
Aside from Hofstede's six cultural dimensions, there are other factors on which culture can be analyzed. There are other levels for assessing culture besides the level of the nation-state. For example, studies have analyzed differences between regions within China and the US. These levels are overlooked often because of the nature of the construction of these levels. There is sampling discrepancy that disqualifies the survey from being authoritative on organizations, or societies, or nations as the interviews involved sales and engineering personnel with few, if any, women and undoubtedly fewer social minorities participating (Moussetes, 2007). Even if country indices were used to control for wealth, latitude, population size, density and growth; privileged males working as engineers or sales personnel in one of the elite organizations of the world, pioneering one of the first multinational projects in history, cannot be claimed to represent their nations.

==== Individual level: cultural dimensions versus individual personalities ====
Hofstede acknowledges that the cultural dimensions he identified, as culture and values, are social constructions, which are the ideas in the world developed by people, and can differ between the different groups and change as time goes by(Burr & Dick, 2017). They are tools meant to be used in practical applications. Generalizations about one country’s culture are helpful, but they have to be regarded just as guidelines, and they do not necessarily apply to everyone. They are group-level dimensions which describe national averages which apply to the population in its entirety. For example, a Japanese person can be very comfortable in changing situations whereas on average, Japanese people have high uncertainty avoidance. There are still exceptions to the rule. Hofstede's theory can be contrasted with its equivalence at individual level: the trait theory about human personality.

Variations on the typologies of collectivism and individualism have been proposed (Triandis, 1995; Gouveia and Ros, 2000). Self-expression and individualism usually increase with economic growth (Inglehart, 1997) independent of any culture, and can help small populations faced with outside competition for resources. (Some examples do exist of collectivist cultures that experienced rapid economic growth yet held on to their collectivist culture, such as the citizens of United Arab Emirates "United Arab Emirates Hofstede Insights". Retrieved 8 June 2020. and other GCC nations). Entitled individuals in positions of power embrace autonomy even if they live in a "collective" culture. Therefore, they might not really inform us at all about any particular organizational dynamic, nor do they inform about the organizational and individual variations within similar socio-economic circumstances. Individual aggregate needs careful separation from nation aggregate (Smith et al., 2008). Whereas individuals are the basic subject of psychological analysis (Smith, 2004), the socialization of individuals and their interaction with society is a matter to be studied at the level of families, peers, neighborhoods, schools, cities, and nations each with its own statistical imprint of culture (Smith, 2004). S. Schwartz controlled his theory “Schwartz theory of basic values,” which indicates that ten personal values are influenced by individual’s inner motivation(Schwartz, 2022), with GNP and a social index, leading to his proposal of differentiated individual and nation indices of itemized values (Schwartz, 1992; 1994) for cross-cultural comparison. The assumed "isomorphism of constructs" has been central to deciding how to use and understand culture in the managerial sciences (Van de Vijver et al. 2008; Fischer, 2009). As no individual can create his/her discourse and sense-making process in isolation to the rest of society, individuals are poor candidates for cultural sense-making.

==== Organizational level ====
Within and across countries, individuals are also parts of organizations such as companies. Hofstede acknowledges that "the […] dimensions of national cultures are not relevant for comparing organizations within the same country". In contrast with national cultures embedded in values, organizational cultures are embedded in practices.

From 1985 to 1987, Hofstede's institute IRIC (Institute for Research on Intercultural Cooperation) has conducted a separate research project in order to study organizational culture. Including 20 organizational units in two countries (Denmark and the Netherlands), six different dimensions of practices, or communities of practice have been identified:

- Process-Oriented vs. Results-Oriented
- Employee-Oriented vs. Job-Oriented
- Parochial vs. Professional
- Open System vs. Closed System
- Loose Control vs. Tight Control
- Pragmatic vs. Normative

Managing international organizations involves understanding both national and organizational cultures. Communities of practice across borders are significant for multinationals in order to hold the company together.

==== Gender level ====
When describing culture, gender differences are largely not taken into consideration. However, there are certain factors that are useful to analyze in the discussion of cross-cultural communication. According to Hofstede's model, men's culture differs greatly from women's culture within each society. Although men and women can often perform the same duties from a technical standpoint, there are often situations to which each gender has a different response. In situations where one gender responds in an alternative manner to their prescribed roles, the other sex may not even accept their deviant gender role. The level of reactions experienced by people exposed to foreign cultures can be compared similarly to the reactions of gender behaviors of the opposite sex. The degree of gender differentiation in a country depends primarily on the culture within that nation and its history.

Hofstede's masculine-feminine dichotomy divides organizations into those exhibiting either compassion, solidarity, collectivism and universalism, or competition, autonomy, merit, results and responsibility. The bipolar model follows typical distinctions made between liberal or socialist political philosophy for Hofstede. Although liberal economies value assertiveness, autonomy, materialism, aggression, money, competition and rationalism, welfare socialism seeks protection and provision for the weak, greater involvement with the environment, an emphasis on nature and well-being, and a strong respect for quality of life and collective responsibilities. According to Gilligan, this dimension is eurocentric and sexist. During the period of Hofstede's study, 'masculine' societies (USA, Japan, Germany) happened to be the most successful economically, while the successful 'feminine' societies (Scandinavia, Costa Rica, France, Thailand) had smaller populations, less economic scale, and/or strong collective or welfare philosophies.

== See also ==
- Cross-cultural communication
- Cultural relativism
- GLOBE study on Global Leadership and Organizational Behaviour Effectiveness
- Intercultural communication
- Group cohesiveness
- National character studies
- Social organization
- Trompenaars's model of national culture differences
- Uncertainty reduction theory
