= Communication in small groups =

Communication in small groups consists of three or more people who share a common goal and communicate collectively to achieve it. During small group communication, interdependent participants analyze data, evaluate the nature of the problem(s), decide and provide a possible solution or procedure. Additionally, small group communication provides strong feedback, unique contributions to the group as well as a critical thinking analysis and self-disclosure from each member. Small groups communicate through an interpersonal exchange process of information, feelings and active listening in both two types of small groups: primary groups and secondary groups. Furthermore, small group communication can be interpreted as a systems perspective, indicating that individuals may interpret the same message differently. For example, in a group project, individuals might have different perspectives of their own goal. These interactions are dynamic because members are continuously sharing ideas, emotion, receiving and sending messages, making small group communication an evolving process. Communication grows, and with it, roles develop. These roles fall into three categories: task roles, social roles, and anti-group roles. Research has indicated that understanding these roles and how they are connected to the group's dynamic will have a positive impact on group collaboration .

== Group communication ==
The first important research study of small group communication was performed in front of a live studio audience in Hollywood California by social psychologist Robert Bales and published in a series of books and articles in the early and mid 1950s . This research entailed the content analysis of discussions within groups making decisions about "human relations" problems (i.e., vignettes about relationship difficulties within families or organizations). Bales made a series of important discoveries. First, group discussion tends to shift back and forth relatively quickly between the discussion of the group task and discussion relevant to the relationship among the members. He believed that this shifting was the product of an implicit attempt to balance the demands of task completion and group cohesion, under the presumption that conflict generated during task discussion causes stress among members, which must be released through positive relational talk. Second, task group discussion shifts from an emphasis on opinion exchange, through an attentiveness to values underlying the decision, to making the decision. This implication that group discussion goes through the same series of stages in the same order for any decision-making group is known as the linear phase model. Third, the most talkative member of a group tends to make between 40 and 50 percent of the comments and the second most talkative member between 25 and 30, no matter the size of the group. As a consequence, large groups tend to be dominated by one or two members to the detriment of the others.

=== Linear phase model ===
The most influential of these discoveries has been the latter; the linear phase model. The idea that all groups performing a given type of task go through the same series of stages in the same order was replicated through the 1950s, 1960s and 1970s; with most finding four phases of discussion. For example, communication researcher B. Aubrey Fisher showed groups going sequentially through an orientation stage, a conflict stage, a stage in which a decision emerges and a stage in which that decision is reinforced. Much of this research (although not necessarily Fisher's) had two fundamental flaws. First, all group data was combined before analysis, making it impossible to determine whether there were differences among groups in their sequence of discussion. Second, group discussion content was compared across the same number of stages as the researcher hypothesized, such that if the researcher believed there were four stages to discussion, there was no way to find out if there actually were five or more. In the 1980s, communication researcher Marshall Scott Poole examined a sample of groups without making these errors and noted substantial differences among them in the number and order of stages. He hypothesized that groups finding themselves in some difficulty due to task complexity, an unclear leadership structure or poor cohesion act as if they feel the need to conduct a "complete" discussion and thus are more likely to pass through all stages as the linear phase model implies, whereas groups feeling confident due to task simplicity, a clear leadership structure and cohesion are more likely to skip stages apparently deemed unnecessary.

=== Idea development ===
Another milestone in the study of group discussion content was early 1960s work by communication researchers Thomas Scheidel and Laura Crowell regarding the process by which groups examine individual proposed solutions to their problem. They concluded that after a proposal is made, groups discuss it in an implied attempt to determine their "comfort level" with it and then drop it in lieu of a different proposal. In a procedure akin to the survival of the fittest, proposals viewed favorably would emerge later in discussion, whereas those viewed unfavorably would not; the authors referred to this process as "spiraling." Although there are serious methodological problems with this work, other studies have led to similar conclusions. For example, in the 1970s, social psychologist L. Richard Hoffman noted that odds of a proposal's acceptance is strongly associated with the arithmetical difference between the number of utterances supporting versus rejecting that proposal. More recent work has shown that groups differ substantially in the extent to which they spiral. Additional developments have taken place within group communication theory as researchers move away from conducting research on zero-history groups, and toward a "bona fide" groups perspective. The bona fide group, as described by Linda L. Putnam and Cynthia Stohl in 1990, fosters a sense of interdependence among the members of the group, along with specific boundaries that have been agreed upon by members over time. This provides researchers with model of group behavior that stays true to the characteristics displayed by most naturally occurring groups.

== Social influence in groups ==
Work relevant to social influence in groups has a long history. Two early examples of social psychological research have been particularly influential. The first of these was by Muzafer Sherif in 1935 using the autokinetic effect. Sherif asked participants to voice their judgments of light movement in the presence of others and noted that these judgments tended to converge. The second of these was a series of studies by Solomon Asch, in which naive participants were asked to voice their judgments of the similarity of the length of lines after hearing the "judgments" of several confederates (research assistants posing as participants) who purposely voiced the same obviously wrong judgment. On about 1/3 of the cases, participants voiced the obviously wrong judgment. When asked why, many of these participants reported that they had originally made the correct judgment but after hearing the confederates, decided the judgments of several others (the confederates) should be trusted over theirs. As a consequence of these and other studies, social psychologists have come to distinguish between two types of social influence; informational and normative (see conformity). Informational influence occurs when group members are persuaded by the content of what they read or hear to accept an opinion; Sherif's study appears to be an example. Normative influence occurs when group members are persuaded by the knowledge that a majority of group members have a view. Normative influence should not be confused with compliance, which occurs when group members are not persuaded but voice the opinions of the group majority. Although some of the participants in the Asch studies who conformed admitted that they had complied, the ones mentioned above who believed the majority to be correct are best considered to have been persuaded through normative influence.

=== Culture ===
Culture affects the entire communication of a person. Within small groups there are three specific factors that affect communication. The first factor covers whether a person prioritizes their needs as more or less important than the group's necessities. The second important factor is power distance, the degree at which people accept and expect that power is distributed unequally. In high-power distance cultures, an individual of low power would not disagree with an individual with more power than him. On the contrary, in low-power distance cultures everyone's input and opinions are taking into account in certain decisions. The third factor that affects communication in small groups is uncertainty avoidance. The degree of tolerance people have for risk. In high uncertainty cultures individuals expect and prefer rules and structurized systems. In those low uncertainty avoidance cultures, individuals prefer and are comfortable with constant change and scarce rules.

Stages of Group Development

Understanding how small group communication develops over time is of great significance to understand changes of communication patterns. This is often explained through Tuckman's stages of group development.

In 1965, Tuckman presented the four stages. Starting off with the Forming stage, which is the orientation phase, where the group clarifies their purpose. Individuals tend to be polite and show signs of anxiety because of the uncertainty of what will occur. The next stage is Storming. Disagreement comes up. Members of the group will state their perspectives, possibly causing conflict to arise. During this stage, confusion can be created over roles, goals and expectations. After this phase, the Norming stage occurs. In this phase the group will start to collaborate, set norms and expectations for each of the individuals. Members will develop trust as they start to feel as part of the group. Research indicates that trust helps to improve communication, teammates resolve conflicts and work together to achieve their goals. The next stage would be the Performing one., where individuals have already developed a strong bond, conflicts are resolved, and they are able to work more independently. The group communicates and coordinates to effectively accomplish their goal.

Later, Tuckman and Jensen decided to add a fifth stage, Adjourning the final stage, which occurs when the group's work is done. During this phase, the group makes sure that they have finalized their project, and reflect on what they accomplished and learned. Emotions such as sadness or nostalgia may arise, while members share how they feels.This stage shows how communication slowly vanishes as the group dissolves and members move on.

Together, all five stages show how small group communication evolves as members organize, manage tension, establish norms, share objectives, and recognize their achievements. Tuckman and Jensen's model is still widely used today in academic and organizational contexts, because it serves as explanation of the challenges that small groups face and how these communication patterns are important for the group's success.

Roles in small groups

In small groups, roles are more likely to naturally arise, rather than being assigned. This happens depending on the situation, their goals and members' skills and interests. Research shows that teams that develop under extreme environments such as some academic situations, where groups may work under strict deadlines, will adopt different group roles to keep balance under stressful conditions. The dynamic of these roles can cause them to vary over time depending on several temporal factors.

Group roles can fall into three different categories: task, social and anti-group roles. Task roles relate to what the group wants to accomplish. Including information seekers, elaborators and administrators. Social roles are based on the members' personalities, abilities, personal backgrounds and interests; examples include the harmonizers, gatekeepers and sensors. There is also anti-group members, who tend to go against the group to prioritize their own needs; which are the blockers, avoiders, distractors, attention seekers, and trolls.

By understanding the dynamic of these roles, group members will be able to recognize different behavior patterns, and learn how to collaborate with them to keep balance and achieve the team's goals under different circumstances.

=== Conflict resolution ===
Any group has conflicts, topics that people do not agree on, different points of view on how to move forward with a task and so on. As a result, to be able to overcome any conflict that might arise, a six step conflict resolution will help to overcome the problem.

- All the group members have to listen carefully to each other
- Understand the different points of view that were discussed
- Be respectful and show interest in maintaining a good relationship with the group members regardless of their opinions
- Try to find a common ground
- Come up with new solutions to the problem or situation
- Finally, reach on a fair agreement that will benefit everyone

=== Group decisions ===
During a small group decision the process can be more open, vulnerable and can rely on several decision techniques. In Stewart Tubbs' systems approach, a common process that small groups incorporate in decision making situations starts by a orientation where each member starts to familiarize or socialize with other members. Secondly, small group members face conflict, where each person shares ideas or possible solutions to a problem. This session is also known as brainstorming. During the conflict stage, subgroups or stronger personalities can emerge. Then, small group members advance to a consensus, where after evaluating several ideas the group agrees to advance. Lastly is closure, where small group team members agree completely on an idea and start taking action.

By the end of the 1950s, studies such as Sherif's led to the reasonable conclusion that social influence in groups leads group members to converge on the average judgment of the individual members. As a consequence, it was a surprise to many social psychologists when in the early 1960s, evidence appeared that group decisions often became more extreme than the average of the individual predisposed judgment. This was originally thought to be a tendency for groups to be riskier than their members would be alone (the risky shift), but later found to be a tendency for extremity in any direction based on which way the members individually tended to lean before discussion (group polarization). Research has clearly demonstrated that group polarization is primarily a product of persuasion not compliance. Two theoretical explanations for group polarization have come to predominate. One is based on social comparison theory, claiming that members look to one another for the "socially correct" side of the issue and if they find themselves deviant in this regard, shift their opinion toward the extreme of the socially correct position. This would be an example of normative influence. The other 'persuasive arguments theory' (PAT), begins with the notion that each group member enters discussion aware of a set of items of information favoring both sides of the issue but lean toward that side that boasts the greater amount of information. Some of these items are shared among the members (all are aware of them), others are unshared (only one member is aware of each). Assuming most or all group members lean in the same direction, during discussion, items of unshared information supporting that direction are voiced, giving members previously unaware of them more reason to lean in that direction. PAT is an example of informational influence. Although PAT has strong empirical support, it would imply that unshared items of information on the opposite side of the favored position would also come up in discussion, canceling the tendency to polarize. Research has shown that when group members all lean in one direction, discussion content is biased toward the side favored by the group, inconsistent with PAT. This finding is consistent with social comparison notions; upon discovering where the group stands, members only voice items of information on the socially correct side. It follows that an explanation for group polarization must include information influence and normative influence.

The possibility exists that the majority of information known to all group members combined, supports one side of an issue but that the majority of information known to each member individually, supports the other side of the issue. For example, imagine that each member of a 4-person group was aware of 3 items of information supporting job candidate A that were only known to that member and 6 items of information supporting job candidate B that were known to all members. There would be 12 items of information supporting candidate A and 6 supporting candidate B but each member would be aware of more information supporting B. Persuasive arguments theory implies that the items of information favoring A should also come up, leading to each member changing their mind but research has indicated that this does not occur. Rather, as predicted by the merging of PAT and social comparison theory, each member would come into discussion favoring B, that discussion would be heavily biased toward B and that the group would choose B for the job. This circumstance, first studied by Stasser and Titus, is known as a "hidden profile" and is more likely to occur as group size increases and as the proportion of shared versus unshared items of information increases.

Many methods may be used in reaching group decisions. The most popular method in Western culture is by majority, but other ways to make team decisions are available. Firstly, voting by majority brings quick decision making, and that is one of the reasons why it is the most widely used. A second method is by consensus. Reaching decisions by consensus is time consuming, but it allows everyone to bring forward their opinion. A third method is by averaging. This method requires all teammates to reach a decision by compromising. Reaching decisions by minority decision calls for a subcommittee getting together and reaching decisions without the whole groupe being involved. A final method is by authority rule. In this method, the group leader listens to individual group member's ideas, and has final say on a decision.

=== Nonverbal communication ===
Body language is a form of nonverbal communication, consisting of body pose, gestures, eye movements and paralinguistic cues (i.e. tone of voice and rate of speech). Humans send and interpret such signals unconsciously. It is often said that human communication consists of 93% body language and paralinguistic cues, while only 7% of communication consists of words themselves - however, Albert Mehrabian, the researcher whose 1960s work is the source of these statistics, has stated that this is a misunderstanding of the findings (see Misinterpretation of Mehrabian's rule).

=== Physical expression ===
Physical expressions like waving, pointing, touching and slouching are all forms of nonverbal communication. The study of body movement and expression is known as kinesics. Humans move their bodies when communicating because as research has shown, it helps "ease the mental effort when communication is difficult." Physical expressions reveal many things about the person using them for example, gestures can emphasize a point or relay a message, posture can reveal boredom or great interest, and touch can convey encouragement or caution.

=== Examples list ===
- Hands on knees: indicates readiness.
- Hands on hips: indicates impatience.
- Lock your hands behind your back: indicates self-control.
- Locked hands behind head: states confidence.
- Sitting with a leg over the arm of the chair: suggests indifference.
- Legs and feet pointed in a particular direction: the direction where more interest is felt
- Crossed arms: indicates submissiveness.

Body language is a form of non-verbal communication involving the use of stylized gestures, postures, and physiologic signs which act as cues to other people. Humans, sometimes unconsciously, send and receive non-verbal signals all the time.

== Body language and space ==
Interpersonal space refers to the psychological "bubble" that we can imagine exists when someone is standing far too close to us. Research has revealed that in North America there are four different zones of interpersonal space. The first zone is called intimate distance and ranges from touching to about eighteen inches apart. Intimate distance is the space around us that we reserve for lovers, children, as well as close family members and friends. The second zone is called personal distance and begins about an arm's length away; starting around eighteen inches from our person and ending about four feet away. We use personal distance in conversations with friends, to chat with associates, and in group discussions. The third zone of interpersonal space is called social distance and is the area that ranges from four to eight feet away from you. Social distance is reserved for strangers, newly formed groups, and new acquaintances. The fourth identified zone of space is public distance and includes anything more than eight feet away from you. This zone is used for speeches, lectures, and theater; essentially, public distance is that range reserved for larger audiences.

=== Language difficulties ===
Misunderstandings in communication are common because of the many different factor, that is the way of conveying message; which is done through language. Though there is no right or wrong way to communicate, avoiding language barriers such as jargon, bypassing, and offensive language may prevent misunderstandings in group or interpersonal discussions. One of the more common barriers in communication is the inappropriate use of jargon. Jargon is a fictive language invented by and for the group as a verbal shorthand. It also syllabifies group membership when used properly. The problem with jargon is that it can make words confusing and can be used to conceal the truth. Another barrier to language is bypassing. Bypassing occurs when group members have different meanings for different words and phrases and thus miss each other's meanings. To overcome the risk of bypassing it is important to look to what the speaker wants and not always at what the speaker says. The third most common language barrier is offensive language. Offensive language is "any terminology that demeans, excludes, or stereotypes people for any reason. Avoiding sexist, discriminating, or labeling talk will greatly reduce chances of miscommunication. Remember, there is no right or wrong way to communicate. Though language difficulties are common, avoiding barriers like jargon, bypassing, and offensive language, will greatly reduce your chances of being misunderstood. Only through habitual awareness can one begin to truly understand and then be understood.

== Sociology ==
Small groups can be the means by which social constraints are enforced, and can also act as an arena in which the constraints can be challenged. Small groups often contain and develop an idioculture, a set of shared meanings as well as negotiate status. Groups are able to provide rewards and punishment in line with societies expectations.

== See also ==
- Bona fide group
- Decision downloading
- Dunbar's number
- Group dynamics
