= Cross-cultural leadership =

Aspect of cross-cultural psychology

Cross-cultural psychology attempts to understand how individuals of different cultures interact with each other. Along these lines, cross-cultural leadership has developed as a way to understand leaders who work in the newly globalized market. Today's international organizations require leaders who can adjust to different environments quickly and work with partners and employees of other cultures. It cannot be assumed that a manager who is successful in one country will be successful in another.

== Related Theories and Research ==
=== Implicit Leadership Theory ===
The Implicit Leadership Theory (ILT) asserts that people's underlying assumptions, stereotypes, beliefs and schemas influence the extent to which they view someone as a good leader. Since people across cultures tend to hold different implicit beliefs, schemas and stereotypes, it would seem only natural that their underlying beliefs in what makes a good leader differ across cultures.

=== Hofstede’s Cultural Dimensions ===
One of the most prominent and influential studies to date regarding leadership in a globalized world is the Hofstede dimensions of culture. The study reveals similarities as well as differences across cultures and emphasizes the need to be open-minded to understand the differences in other cultures. Hofstede utilizes six dimensions of culture to compare cultures to give leaders an understanding of how to adjust their leadership styles accordingly. These dimensions include individualism/collectivism, feminine/masculine, power distance, uncertainty avoidance, long-term/short-term orientation, and indulgence/restraint.

=== GLOBE ===
The Global Leadership and Organizational Behavior Effectiveness Research Project (GLOBE) study incorporated both the ILT and Hofstede's dimensions into one unique research study. The GLOBE study extended the ILT to include individuals of a common culture maintaining a relatively stable common belief about leaders, which varies from culture to culture. They labeled this the Culturally Endorsed Implicit Leadership Theory (CLT). The GLOBE study came up with the nine dimensions of uncertainty avoidance, power distance, collectivism I: societal collectivism, collectivism II: in-group collectivism, gender egalitarianism, assertiveness, future orientation, performance orientation and humane orientation. Some of those dimensions correlate with the respective dimension from Hofstede. However, they differ since the GLOBE dimensions distinguish between cultural values and cultural practices, as opposed to Hofstede.

=== Leadership styles ===
==== Paternalistic leadership ====
Paternalistic leadership “combines strong discipline and authority with fatherly benevolence and moral integrity couched in a ‘personalistic’ atmosphere”. Paternalistic leadership is composed of three main elements: authoritarianism, benevolence, and moral leadership. At its roots, paternalistic leadership refers to a hierarchical relationship in which the leader takes personal interest in the workers’ professional and personal lives in a manner resembling a parent, and expects loyalty and respect in return. These leaders want to transform a team into a family-like group. They would like to know employees' quality of the life overall such as hobbies, parents' health condition, and children's education.

A great deal of research has been conducted on the prevalence of this leadership style in non-Western business organizations, indicating the prevalence of paternalistic leadership in countries like mainland China and Taiwan. However, considerably less research has been done on whether paternalistic leadership exists in Western cultures. Recently, there has been an increase in the amount of attention placed on paternalistic leadership in non-Western cultures. Although it is a relatively new area of focus in leadership research, evidence has been found supporting the relationship between paternalism and positive work attitudes in numerous cultures, including those of the Middle East, Latin America, and Pacific Asia. Paternalistic leadership has been found to be positively associated with job satisfaction in India but not in the United States. In both countries, paternalistic leadership was positively related to leader-member exchange and organizational commitment.

==== Transformational & transactional leadership ====
Transformational leadership is loosely defined as a charismatic leadership style that rallies subordinates around a common goal with enthusiasm and support. Transactional leadership is characterized by a give-and-take relationship using rewards as an incentive.

In a 2004 questionnaire study of employees at 10 different banks, responses indicated that only 3 of the 7 factors that were found in the ideal leadership style in Egypt corresponded with the US factors. The other 4 were unique to Egypt or perhaps the Middle East in general. These results indicate an inability to assume that transactional and transformational leadership will succeed in non-western cultures. In a study of transactional and transformational leadership in China and Australia, transformational leadership predicted performance and trust in the Australian population, but only predicted trust, not performance, in the Chinese population. Transactional leadership did not predict trust or performance in either population.

Other findings, however, saw a strong presence of transformational and/or transactional leadership in China, India, Kenya, and the U.S. Allocentrists, similar to collectivists, respond more positively to transformational leadership because they unite individuals around a common goal. Idiocentrists (individuals found in individualistic cultures) are more amenable to transactional leaders who reward individuals for hard work and success and less amenable to leaders who encourage group work and reduce individual identity.

=== Effects of cultural values in management ===
Differences in performance of management functions (Planning, Organizing, Commanding, Coordinating, controlling) across countries arise from different value orientations.

==== Time focus ====
Different cultures have different perceptions of time according to their environment, history, traditions and general practices.

- Monochronic - Planning is task-oriented; Organizing is structured, linear and task-focused; Commanding - put emphasis on making and following plans, managing the inflow and distribution of detailed information; Coordinating is focused on the shorter term, meets immediate needs and requirements; Controlling use control systems that depend on detailed information and involve strict deadlines.
- Polychronic - Planning is people-oriented; Organising is less structured, more holistic in nature and people-focused; Commanding - flexible, react to changing circumstances, give priority to people over plans, relies on sharing knowledge and information; Coordinating - is focused on the longer term, with concern for building relationships over time; Controlling use more flexible control systems involving people in addition to information.

==== Time orientation ====
- Past orientation - Planning put emphasis on continuing traditions; Organizing decisions are made within the context of the customs of the society, past goals and precedents guide the process of organizing; Commanding - develop vision and mission statements with emphasis on company's values and reputation; Coordinating - involves slower adapting of the criteria by which the management select and train employees; Controlling develop performance objectives in keeping with customary goals.
- Future orientation - Planning put emphasis on long-term plans and long-term results; Organizing - work and resources are divided and co-ordinated to meet long-range goals and projections for the future; Commanding - develop vision and mission statements with focus on achieving long-term benefits; Coordinating involves selecting and training employees to meet long-term business goals; Controlling develop performance objectives in the context of long-term goals.

==== Power ====
- Hierarchy - Planning - autocratic; Organization structure is tightly controlled, authority and responsibility are centralized; Commanding - employees are closely supervised and feel comfortable with a directive supervisor; Coordinating - subordinates expect bosses to take initiative to train, develop and promote them; Controlling - personal control preferred over impersonal control systems.
- Equality - Planning - participative planning; Organizational structure encourages individual autonomy, authority is decentralized to lowest possible level; Commanding - participative or consultative management style, employees are not afraid to disagree with their managers; Coordinating - work relationships are not strictly prescribed in terms of behaviours and roles; Controlling - subordinates work with bosses to develop, implement, monitor and alter performance objectives.

==== Competitiveness ====
- Competitive - Planning - emphasis on speed and task performance; Organization structure individual achievement is encouraged in organizing the work, managers have more of leadership role; Commanding - leader's role is to track and reward achievement, higher stress in working process; Coordinating - employees are selected on their ability to work independently; Controlling - performance-based systems.
- Co-operative - Planning - emphasis on maintaining relationships in plan implementation; Organization structure group integration, positive working environment, convenient schedules, managers have facilitating role; Commanding - leader's role is facilitate mutually beneficial relationships; Coordinating - employees are selected on their ability to work well in group; Controlling - task performance and team effectiveness.

==== Activity ====
- Doing cultures - Planning - developing measurable, time-framed action steps; Organizing involves action-oriented documentation for project management with clearly spelled out tasks; Commanding - managers are effective if they have the necessary expertise and competence; Coordinating - employees are chosen on their ability to carry out organizational tasks; Controlling - estimates task performance and the way how it was done.
- Being cultures - Planning - strong focus on the vision or ideal a company wishes to attain; Organizing more focused on common vision and personal trust; Commanding - managers are effective if their personal philosophy, values and style are seen are compatible; Coordinating - career development is based not only on performance but also on personal and social criteria; Controlling - estimates effectiveness and adaptability.

==== Space ====
- Private - Planning - usage of individualistic or systematic forms of planning; Organizing approaches are centred on tasks; Commanding - managers and employees do not share the same office; Coordinating - explicit information about how staff should be employed; Controlling - managers use explicit measures of performance.
- Public - Planning - usage of group-oriented or authoritative forms of planning; Organizing approaches are centred on relationships; Commanding - location and size of office where employee works does not reflect that person's rank in the company; Coordinating - implicit information about how staff should be employed; Controlling - managers use explicit measures of performance.

==== Communication ====
- Low-context - Planning - explicit, detailed, quantifiable and information-based; Organizing - task-responsibility guidelines are explicit; Commanding - managers get work done through others by outlining specific goals and ways to achieve them, explicit communication and depersonalized conflict; Coordinating - detailed contracts of employment and explicit performance appraisals; Controlling -task driven control in accordance with monitoring and control procedures used to ensure performance objectives.
- High-context - Planning - implicit, less detailed in terms of instructions; Organizing - job descriptions and responsibilities are implicit and understood according to the context; Commanding - managers get work done through others by giving attention to relationships and group processes, conflicts must be resolved before work can progress; Coordinating - criteria, methods for recruitment, selection, appraisal process and firing are not explicit; Controlling -process-driven.

==== Structure ====
- Individualism - Planning - those, that involved in planning will take initiative to present their views; Organizational structure emphasize the individual in tasks assignments and resources allocation; Commanding - leaders expect employees to meet or exceed their responsibilities and defend their own interests; Coordinating - organizations are not expected to look after their employees' career development; Controlling tends to be exerted by individual standards of excellence, fear of losing self-respect discourages deviance from standards. In their research, Dickson, Den Hartog, and Mitchelson (2003) delve into the nuances of how individualism shapes leadership dynamics across different cultures. They suggest that the cultural backdrop significantly influences how leaders develop their individualistic qualities, which in turn affects their decision-making and leadership styles.
- Collectivism - Planning - plans are developed within the shared values used for measuring and justifying activities in the organization; Organizational structure emphasize the group, the team is assigned tasks and resources; Commanding - leaders expect loyalty in exchange for protection, group or top-down decisions are the norm; Coordinating - promotion is based primarily on seniority, managers are evaluated according to how well they conform to organizational or group norms; Controlling deviation from standards and expectations is discouraged through group-oriented pressure.

== Definitions ==
=== Organizational leadership and culture ===
In the leadership literature, there is a lack of consensus over how to define and refer to cross-cultural leadership. In the GLOBE study, researchers don't specifically define cross-cultural leadership; rather they outline it in two components; organizational leadership and culture. The authors describe organizational leadership as “the ability of an individual to influence, motivate, and enable others to contribute toward the effectiveness and success of the organizations of which they are members”. The authors note that there is no universal definition for culture, but GLOBE's definition includes “shared motives, values, beliefs, identities, and interpretations or meanings of significant events that result from common experiences of members of collectives and are transmitted across age generations”.

=== International executive ===
Another term for a cross-cultural leader is "international executive", defined as “an executive who is in a job with some international scope, whether in an expatriate assignment or in a job dealing with international issues more generally”. International executive plays an important role in the development of enterprises, the success of multinational corporations (MNCs) largely depends on the adaptability of their leadership and the effectiveness of managing people across borders.

=== Global Leadership ===
Global leadership has been defined as “a process of influencing the thoughts, attitudes, and behaviors of a global community to work together synergistically toward a common vision and common goals”. Six core dimensions of competencies of a global leader have been identified: cross-cultural relationship skills, traits and values, cognitive orientation, global business expertise, global organizing expertise, and visioning.

== Operationalizations ==
In researching the international executive, Spreitzer et al. (1997) found that general intelligence, business knowledge, interpersonal skills, commitment, courage and ease in dealing with cross-cultural issues are traits that resonate throughout the literature in illustrating a successful international executive. They indicated a lack of academic research predictors of “international executive” success, but agree that open personality, flexibility, drive and language skills all contribute to a successful international executive.

Rather than delineating a term for the leader, Rentsch, Mot, and Abbe (2009) describe a specific trait that is attributed to multicultural leadership known as multicultural perspective-taking: the ability of such leaders to “take the perspective of another within the cultural context, to apply cultural lenses, and to adapt quickly when encountering individuals or groups from unfamiliar cultures”.

Cross-cultural organizational behavior refers to the overall behaviors that a cross-cultural leader should embody; that is, “cross-cultural similarities and differences in processes and behaviors at work, and the dynamics of cross-cultural interfaces in multicultural domestic and international contexts”. In international business, cross-cultural competence refers to “an individual’s effectiveness in drawing upon a set of knowledge, skills, and personal attributes in order to work successfully with people from different national cultural backgrounds at home or abroad”. The focus here is not on acquiring knowledge, but rather on how the individual uses knowledge they already have acquired.

In a similar study conducted by Abbe, et al. (2007), this same concept of cross-cultural competence (here referred to as 3C), was found to enable leaders to interact in any culture, as opposed to language and regional knowledge, which only work in specific cultures. 3C is dynamic and subject to develop over time. The authors established three components of cross-cultural competence, which include knowledge and cognition, cultural awareness, cross-cultural schema, and cognitive complexity. Abbe et al. (2007) found that a leader will be successful working in another culture if personal, work, and interpersonal domains are met.

== Implications for practice ==
Implications of this need for cross-cultural leaders can be seen in the human resource departments within these global organizations. There is a strong agreement across the literature that the selection process plays a key role in hiring the people who will be most effective cross-cultural leaders. The articles detail specific personality traits and individual differences that promote quality cross-cultural leadership for multicultural settings. They also all emphasize across the board the need to hire individuals who already have prior extensive international experience, beyond vacationing in a given country.

Additionally, there have been many studies published regarding the effect of intercultural training on expatriate success. While some disagree and question the effectiveness of training, most authors indicate that there is some, if only minor, success factor in intercultural training. There is no disagreement about the need for intercultural sensitivities and communication skills; it is the process of attaining these skills that is in question.

Spreitzer, McCall Jr., Mahoney (1997) believe that executives attain these skills through continuous learning, and an array of differentiated projects and experiences which all lead to an accumulated knowledge. Mintzberg and Gosling (2002) agree that executives learn through experience and note that they get to their level because of those experiences. They add that it would be detrimental to the executives to remove them from their experiential learning to sit them in a classroom and instead encourage a learning technique that incorporates classroom learning during short breaks from their job, roughly two weeks of every sixteen months. Hechanova et al. (2003) add that in effective cross-cultural training that is provided by many organizations is actually more detrimental than none at all.

According to Kealey and Protheroe, the three most important ingredients to successful work overseas include the aptitudes and motivations of the expatriate and his immediate family, the aptitudes and motivation of the local counterparts and the overall organization of the project. Therefore, while training is important, only a piece of one of the three aspects, expatriate's personal aptitudes, can be altered by training.

== Notes ==
32. Kumaresan, Venkat (2019). Father Of Your Team.India: BUUKS.ISBN 978-9389113891

== See also ==
- Cultural dimensions
- Cross-cultural psychology
