= Denis Duclos =

French sociologist and author

Denis Duclos (born 1947 in Neuilly-sur-Seine, Hauts-de-Seine) is a French sociologist, Ph.D. and research director at the CNRS (National Centre for Scientific Research) in Paris. He is the author of The werewolf complex: America's fascination with violence. He is also the author of studies on environmental risk.

== Biography ==
His main research field has been the phenomenon of societal "great fears" for both scapegoat characters (like "serial killers") and collective actions viewed as generating disasters.

He interprets these fears as "symptomatic" positions, that is to say, which are formed in place of explicit political positions, when reasonable conversation is impossible on crucial issues. The subjects of fear rarely relate directly to a real problem at stake. For example, the serial killer, as a myth, represented, in the United States, the difficulty of finding a balance between legal system and individual freedom: both having the potential of turning into monstrosity. Another example: the fear of "mad cow" disease (due to industrial feeding of cattle) seemed to represent a more fundamental issue: artificiality of our lifestyles and our interventions on life forms and their natural intermingling. The fear of climate change reflects the broader problem of the difficulty to pass from a world composed of human entities in conflict to a world where humanity acts "as one man." The most blatant and more constant symptomatic transfer is the hatred/fear of the "Jewish conspirator" who appears to embody a rejection on the others of the guilt associated in Christian society, to the act of making God equal to Man (and therefore to symbolically "kill" God or the Father). Indeed, no one can explain the recurrence of this hatred/fear without analysing the regular trait it represents within Western civilization, as if "mechanically".

In the background of these phenomena, which can rightly be named "pathologies", Denis Duclos (who worked with the British anthropologist Mary Douglas) built a theory of cultural fields, of their conversational structure (counterpoint to the tendency to domination observed by Pierre Bourdieu). He considers in particular the emergence of "positional" clusters which tend to directly organize themselves into a global conversation, gradually moving away from their traditional shells: religious, national, international and civilizational fields. For example, it appears (supported by surveys) that the European field is largely centered by the question of law (as an eventually quantifiable system of relations): The Anglo-Saxon position tends to equate law and society, while the "latin" response anchors the law in civic local conditions, whereas another position (German) is based on the necessary correspondence between law and a wide community spirit. This conversation is a special case of a pluralization of positions to be found at other levels, but also, ultimately, in the basic attitudes of all cultures (as shown by P. Descola according to Claude Lévi-Strauss.) On the assumption that, in a sense (related to the fact that homo sapiens is speaking) there has potentially only ever been one human cultural field, Denis Duclos questions History as a confluence of separating and unifying trends. He raises the problem of the pluralistic frame which, in a “society-world”, will necessarily supersede existing intermediate forms, too deeply embedded into outdated and self-centered organizations.

Duclos has also published in the Revue de Mauss, a French anti-utilitarian journal.

== Works ==
=== French language ===
- La santé et le travail, ("Occupational Health") La Découverte, 1986, 128 p.
- La peur et le savoir: les sociétés face à la science, la technique et leurs dangers ("Fear and Knowledge : societies facing science, technique and their hazards") La Découverte, 1990
- Les industriels et les risques pour l'environnement, ("Industry Business and Environmental risks") L'Harmattan,1991, 250 p.
- L'homme face au risque technique, ("Man confronted to Risk") l'Harmattan, 1991, 275 p.
- Risques technologiques et catastrophes industrielles ("Technological hazards and industrial disasters"), in L'Etat des sciences et des techniques La Découverte, 1991.
- Modernité et contrôle des menaces ("Modernity and control of threats") (Chap. 13) in Sortie de Siècle (JPDurand) Paris, Vigot, 1991.
- De la civilité, ou comment les sociétés apprivoisent la puissance, ("Civility or : how societies are taming power") La Découverte, 1993
- Nature et Démocratie des passions, ("Nature and Democracy among Passions") PUF, 1997
- Le Complexe du loup-garou : la fascination de la violence dans la culture américaine ("Werewolf complex : America’s fascination with violence") La Découverte, 1994, Pocket-Agora, 1998
- Démocratie des techniques et choix énergétiques ("Technology, Democracy and energy choices") in L'énergie, des usages et des hommes Editions du Cercle d'art, Paris, 1999.
- Les quatre natures de l'homme, ("The Four Natures of Man") Conclusion to L'environnement, question sociale, dix ans de recherches pour le ministère de l'Environnement. Editions Odile Jacob, 2001
- L'empreinte des formations subjectives dans l'histoire, ("Tracking the signs of Subjective Structures in History") in L'anthropologie psychanalytique, Anthropos, 2002
- Heurs et malheurs du concept de risque ("Fortunes and misfortunes of the concept of risk") in: Dictionnaire des risques (Y.Dupont, dir), Armand Colin, 2003, pp 327–345
- Entre esprit et corps, La culture contre le suicide collectif ("Between Body and Spirit: Culture against collective suicide") Paris, Anthropos, 2002, 260 p.
- Société-monde : le temps des ruptures, ("Society-World : times of disruptions") La Découverte, 2004
- La nostalgie gothique comme ingrédient de la société informatisée (preface to the book of Valérie de Courville Nicol Le soupçon gothique, l'intériorisation de la peur en occident ("Gothic nostalgia as an ingredient in the information society") Les presses de l'université de Montréal, 2005
- La fonction imaginaire de la structure symbolique : ou comment revisiter Lévi-Strauss, in La fonction symbolique, retour aux sources et actualités ("The imaginary function of the symbolic structure: revisiting Levi-Strauss", in "The symbolic function") M. Zafiropoulos ( ed.) Economica, Paris, 2005
- L'invention du langage ("Invention of language"), Anthropos, 2007
- Les sondages d'opinion ("Opinion polls") (with Hélene Y. Meynaud) La Découverte, 2007 (4th edition)
- Esprit et Corps : l'idéal collectif suicidaire et la résistance du vivant, in La technique et le façonnement du monde : mirages et désenchantement ("Mind and Body: the collective suicidal ideal and how the living beings are resisting it", in "Engineering and shaping the world : illusions and disillusionment") Gilbert Vincent (ed.), L'harmattan, Paris, 2007.
- Pourquoi tardons-nous tant à devenir écologistes ? Société écologique et post-modernité, ("Why are we so slow to become Environmentalists? Ecological Society and post-modernity") with the participation of Mary Douglas, Alain Caillé, Michel Freitag, Gilles Gagné, Olivier Clain Bernard Kalaora, André Micoud, Florence Rudolf, Michelle Dobré). L'Harmattan, Paris, Avril 2007

=== Other languages ===
- The Werewolve's Complex : American fascination with violence, Berg International, Oxford-New York, 1997.
- Per una nuova ecologica politica, Edizioni Dedalo, Bari, 2000, 336 pp
- La vocazione suicida del potere collettivo : culmine dell umano, eterno focolaio dell'inumano in Umano, Post-Umano, potere, sapere, etica nell'età globale edited by Helena Pulcini, Editori Riuniti, 2005.
- To Symplegma tou lycanthropou. I Elxi tis americanis coultouras pros ti via, Editions Koxlias, Athènes, 2006, 318 p.
