= IDV =

IDV or IdV may refer to:

- Indinavir, an antiretroviral drug
- Integrated Data Viewer, a software library
- Italy of Values (Italian: Italia dei Valori), a political party
- C.S.D. Independiente del Valle, a football club
- IDV, a successor company to Diageo
- Identity V, a 2018 video game
- International Distillers & Vintners, a former wine and spirits distribution company
- Individualism Index (IDV), a measure of a person's independence from organizations or collectivity
- Iveco Defence Vehicles (IDV), defence company of Italy, of Iveco.
