= Philippe d'Iribarne =

French author

Philippe d’Iribarne (born 7 March 1937, Casablanca, French Morocco) is a French author and director of research at CNRS. He works within a research centre called LISE (Laboratoire interdisciplinaire en sociologie économique or "interdisciplinary laboratorium on economic sociology").

== Work ==
Philippe d'Iribarne graduated from École polytechnique of France and from Institut d'études politiques de Paris.

He is one of the most notable critics of the limitations of the works of Geert Hofstede, expressing concern that "a theory of culture that considers culture to be ‘shared meaning’ does not allow for representation of the forms of unity and continuity." Part of d'Iribarne's objections have been with the weaknesses of Hofstede's terminology in general and category names specifically (e.g., power distance as a culture as whole versus a culture's acceptance of hierarchy only within organizational settings). More pointedly, d'Iribarne questions the generalized conclusions that Hofstede draws from the data, imposing Hofstede's own value system on what the data show. For instance, d'Iribarne questioned Hofstede's conclusions from the uncertainty avoidance statistics, arguing that Hofstede superimposes his own view that data. For d'Iribarne, Hofstede simply presumes that showing high stress at work correlates with weak uncertainty avoidance, while d'Iribarne asserts that the presence of high stress could just as readily indicate high stress results from high uncertainty avoidance, since no external control exists in low uncertainty avoidance cultures. Finally, d'Iribarne questions Hofstede's implicit assumption of uniformity in complex organizations, let alone entire national cultures. Such assumptions of uniformity are useful, d'Iribarne writes only "if one thinks of a culture specific to a close-knit community." Instead, though, d'Iribarne notes that in most situations, "society is split into more or less antagonistic groups" and in any case, "meaning is not only received but produced"; in short, Hofstede does not allow for the fact that people do not remain static in how they interact with one another. Philippe d'Iribarne fills out the bare bones of Hofstede's simplified structure, a point with which Hofstede himself acknowledged when he wrote that,"The two approaches are complementary -- mine is more quantitative, d'iribarne's more qualitative. I provided a skeleton for the countries he studied, and he provided the flesh. The skeleton I proposed is a worldwide structure in cultural differences among cultures."

Iribarne's interest is on the influence of national cultures on the way organisations function. He and his team within the LISE have so far surveyed organisations in 40-odd countries in Europe, Africa, America and Asia. Jorion has also published in the Revue de Mauss, a French anti-utilitarian journal.

== Books ==
=== In French ===
- 1989 - La logique de l’honneur, Seuil ISBN 2-02-020784-2
- 1998 - Cultures et mondialisation (with Alain Henry, Jean-Pierre Segal, Sylvie Chevrier, Tatjana Globokar) ISBN 978-2-02-054281-4
- 2003 - Le Tiers-monde qui réussit : Nouveaux modèles, Odile Jacob ISBN 2-7381-1332-X
- 2006 - L'étrangeté française, Seuil ISBN 2-02-086038-4
- 2008 - Penser la diversité du monde, Seuil

=== In English ===
- Successful Companies in the Developing World, AFD, 2007
