= Jean-Pierre Voyer =

French philosopher

Jean-Pierre Voyer (b. 1938, Bolbec, d. 2019, Pont-Audemer) was a post-situationist French philosopher. His main thesis was the non-existence of economy, and he claimed to be inspired by Hegel and Marx, although he was very critical of the latter. He criticized utilitarianism and has been published in the Revue de Mauss, a French anti-utilitarian journal.

== Bibliography ==
- Reich, mode d'emploi ("Reich, How to use"), 1971, Champ libre editions (about Wilhelm Reich) (Full text)
- with Jean-Jacques Raspaud : L'Internationale situationniste (The Situationist International), 1972, Champ libre
- Introduction à la science de la publicité ("Introduction to the Advertising Science"), 1975, Champ libre
- Une enquête sur la cause et la nature de la misère des gens ("An Investigation into the Cause and the Nature of the Misery of People"), 1976, Champ libre
- Rapport sur l'état des illusions dans notre parti ("Report about the State of the Illusions in our Party") followed by Révélations sur le principe du monde ("Revelations about the Principle of the World"), 1979, Institut de préhistoire contemporaine
- Fin du situationnisme paisible ("End of Peaceful Situationnism"), 1981, Institut de préhistoire contemporaine
- Revue de préhistoire contemporaine ("Journal of Contemporary Prehistory") N°1, 1982, Institut de préhistoire contemporaine
- Hécatombe ("Hecatomb"), 1991, La Nuit
- L'Imbécile de Paris ("The Imbecile of Paris"), 1995, Éditions anonymes
- Limites de conversation ("Limits of Conversation"), 1998, Éditions anonymes
- Diatribe d'un fanatique ("Diatribe of a Fanatic" Full text), 2002, Éditions anonymes (about 9/11)
