= Individualism Index =

Individual independence from organizations or collectivity

The Individualism Index (IDV) refers to an individual's independence from organizations or collectivity.

== See also ==
- Geert Hofstede
- Hofstede's cultural dimensions theory
- Social organization#Collectivism and individualism
