= Paul Jorion =

Belgian anthropologist and sociologist (born 1946)

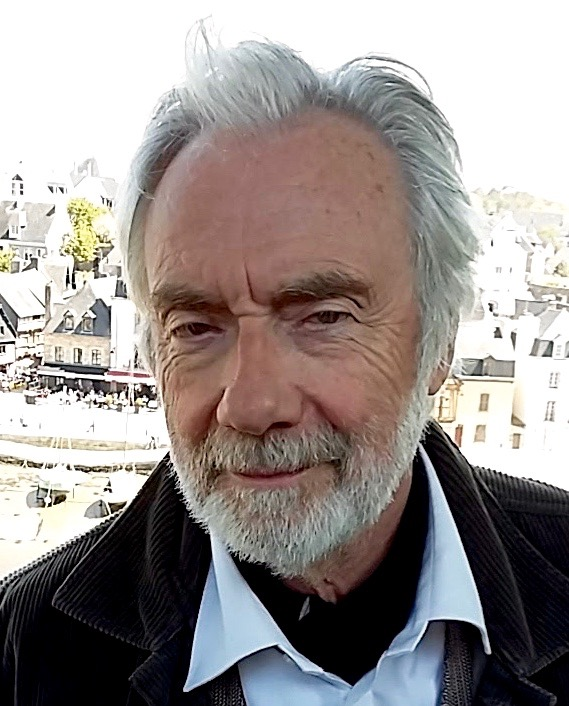
- Born: 22 July 1946 (age 80); Belgium
- Education: Claude Lévi-Strauss

Paul Jorion (born 22 July 1946 in Brussels) is an anthropologist and sociologist with a special interest in the cognitive sciences. He has also written seven books on capitalist economics.

Born and raised in Belgium, Jorion currently lives in France, where he runs a blog on financial and economic matters. In 2012, the Vrije Universiteit Brussel made him holder of the newly created "Stewardship of Finance" chair.

== Kinship studies ==
A student of Claude Lévi-Strauss and of French mathematician Georges-Théodule Guilbaud in modeling kinship systems with algebraic models, Jorion has made several contributions to the field, solving in particular the marriage pattern of the Pende of the Congo (in collaboration with Gisèle de Meur and Trudeke Vuyk), reconciling also conflicting interpretations of the kinship system of the Australian Murngin (from research done jointly with Edmund Leach, his teacher at Cambridge University). Collaborating with Douglas R. White he has published several papers in the formalization of kinship algebra.

== Memory and consciousness ==
In an article published in 1999, Jorion offered a new theory of consciousness which goes beyond the Freudian notion that some of our decisions have unconscious motives by suggesting that in fact all our decision-making has unconscious roots, revealing freewill to be an illusion. Consciousness is shown to be a consequence of a mechanism allowing us to perceive as simultaneous the sensations produced separately by our five senses, a necessary preliminary to creating memory traces, that is, also, the prerequisite to any learning process. Drawing the consequences of an observation made by Benjamin Libet, that intention is an artifact as it springs to consciousness half a second later than the action it is supposed to have generated, Jorion further suggested that consciousness errs when it assumes to be the cause of human actions while it is nothing more than an ancillary consequence of the registration process that allows memory to accrue.

== Artificial intelligence ==
In 1989, Jorion participated in the work of the artificial intelligence unit of British Telecom. There he developed "ANELLA" (Associative Network with Emerging Logical and Learning Abilities) whose "intelligence" is guided by a dynamics of affect – acting at the same time as a dynamics of relevance. In his book entitled "Principes des systèmes intelligents" published the next year, he made a wager that psychoanalysis will turn out to offer Artificial Intelligence its genuine theoretical framework.

== Economics ==
His interest in behavioral theory has led Jorion to work on stock market behavior as a pricing specialist and, for a period, as a trader on the futures markets in a French investment bank. Despite, or because of, his work Jorion has become a critic of the structure of financial capitalism. He has deplored in particular the shift in accounting standards from a definition of price based on "fundamentals," i.e. "value," to "just value" equating with the speculative price (Financial Accounting Standards Board 157). He has been instrumental at reviving Aristotle's theory of price, based on the power balance between buyer and seller, and has applied it to understand our current financial systems (Le prix).

On 4 September 2007, in an op-ed for the French daily Le Monde, he proposes that, as is the case for the political sphere, the economy is given a proper constitution (L’économie a besoin d’une authentique constitution). In an interview in L’Humanité published January 2008, Jorion contends that contrary to the title of his 2007 book Is American Capitalism Heading to Crisis? (Vers la crise du capitalisme américain?), the distinctive form of Capitalism in the United States has already fallen into crisis.

"We are experiencing the consequences of the planned disappearance of welfare by deregulation. By strengthening the law of the strongest, the United States is heading toward a disaster never seen before, which I can only compare to the one of 1929".

In his 2008 book The Implosion. Finance vs. the Economy: what the subprime crisis reveals and foretells (L'implosion. La finance contre l'économie: ce qu'annonce et révèle la crise des subprimes) he emphasizes that the economy - unlike the political system with democracy - has not been raised to the status of a proper human institution and requires a similar self-domestication.

Jorion has also published in the Revue de Mauss, a French anti-utilitarian journal.

== Bibliography ==
=== Books ===
- Les pêcheurs de Houat: anthropologie économique, Collection Savoir, Hermann, Paris, 1983
- La transmission des savoirs (with Geneviève Delbos), Editions de la Maison des Sciences de l'Homme, Paris, 1984, ISBN 2-7351-0113-4
- Principes des systèmes intelligents, Dunod, Paris, 1997, ISBN 2-225-81938-6 (original ed. Masson, 1990).
- Investing in a Post-Enron World, McGraw-Hill, New York, 2003, ISBN 0-07-140938-6.
- Vers la crise du capitalisme américain?, La Découverte, Paris, 2007, ISBN 978-2-7071-5092-9; reprint: Éditions du Croquant, Broissieux, 2009, ISBN 978-2-914968-62-1 (English title: Are we Heading for a Crisis of American Capitalism?)
- L'implosion. La finance contre l'économie: ce qu'annonce et révèle la crise des subprimes, Fayard, Paris, 2008, ISBN 978-2-213-63741-9 (English title: The Implosion. Finance against the Economy: what the Subprime Crisis Foretells and Reveals)
- La crise. Des subprimes au séisme financier planétaire, Fayard, Paris, 2008, ISBN 978-2-213-63860-7 (English title: The Crisis. From Subprimes to Planetary Seism)
- L'argent, mode d'emploi, Fayard, Paris, 2009, ISBN 978-2-213-64404-2 (English title: Money, A Handbook)
- Comment la vérité et la réalité furent inventées, Gallimard, Paris 2009, ISBN 978-2-07-012600-2 (English title: How Truth and Reality Were Invented)
  - Deutsch: Die Erfindung von Wahrheit und Wirklichkeit. Translated by Christian Driesen, Turia + Kant, Wien 2021, ISBN 978-3-85132-995-7
- Le prix, Éditions du Croquant, Broissieux, 2010, ISBN 978-2-914968-78-2 (English title: Price)
- Le capitalisme à l'agonie, Fayard, Paris, 2011, ISBN 978-2-213-65488-1 (English title: The Promised Death of Capitalism).
- La guerre civile numérique, Textuel, Paris, 2011, ISBN 978-2-84597-420-3.
- Misère de la pensée économique, Paris, Fayard, 360 p., 2012 ISBN 978-2-213-66631-0
- La survie de l'espèce (avec Grégory Maklès), Paris, Futuropolis, 2012 ISBN 978-2754807258
  - Deutsch: Das Überleben der Spezies. Eine kritische, aber nicht ganz hoffnungslose Betrachtung des Kapitalismus (Egmont Graphic Novel, Köln, 2014)
- Comprendre les temps qui sont les nôtres, Paris, Odile Jacob, 2014 ISBN 978-2738130891
- Penser l'économie autrement (with Bruno Colmant), Paris, Fayard, 2014 ISBN 2213682267
- Penser tout haut l'économie avec Keynes, Paris, Odile Jacob, 2015 ISBN 2738133088
- Le dernier qui s'en va éteint la lumière, Paris, Fayard, 2016 ISBN 9782213699035
  - Deutsch: Der Letzte macht das Licht aus. Ein Essay über die Auslöschung der menschlichen Spezies (Zweitausendeins, Leipzig, 2018)
- Se débarrasser du capitalisme est une question de survie, Paris, Fayard, 2017 ISBN 9782213706429
- À quoi bon penser à l'heure du grand collapse?, Paris, Fayard, collection « Documents », 2017 ISBN 2213705518
  - Deutsch: Nur Mut! Kritisches Denken im Angesicht der Katastrophe (Zweitausendeins, Leipzig, 2019)
- Vers un nouveau monde, Waterloo, Renaissance du livre, 2017 ISBN 2507055251
- Défense et illustration du genre humain, Paris, Fayard, collection « Documents », 2018 ISBN 978-2-213-70189-9
  - Deutsch: Im Zweifel für die Menschheit. Verteidigung einer Spezies am Abgrund (Zweitausendeins, Leipzig, 2019) ISBN 978-3-96318-039-2
- Comment sauver le genre humain, (with Vincent Burnand-Galpin), Paris, Fayard, 2020 ISBN 978-2213716848
- (Editor): Humanism and its Discontents. The Rise of Transhumanism and Posthumanism (Palgrave Macmillan, London, 2022) ISBN 978-3-030-67003-0
- L’avènement de la Singularité. L’humain ébranlé par l’intelligence artificielle (Éditions Textuel, Paris 2024) ISBN 978-2-38629-000-8

=== Articles ===
- Ausruf des Notstands für die Menschheit?, Journal "Courant d’Air" septembre 2019, Pages 3–7, mouvement "Changeons demain", Belgique, Interview with Paul Jorion, 3 juin 2019
- Reasons vs. Causes: Emergence as experienced by the human agent, eJournal of Anthropological and Related Sciences, vol. 2, avril 2007
- Althusser (with Armel Jorion), Foucault, Lévi-Strauss in New Makers of Modern Culture, 2 vol., Justin Wintle (sous la dir.), New York: Routledge, 2006
- Adam Smith's "Invisible Hand" Revisited. An Agent-Based Simulation of the New York Stock Exchange, Proceedings of the First World Congress on Social Simulation, Kyoto, vol. 1, août 2006
- Stephen E. G. Lea et Paul Webley, Keeping up with the Joneses, Comment on Money as tool, money as drug : The biological psychology of a strong incentive, Behavioural & Brain Sciences, 29 (2), 2006
- Why, like cats, we have nine lives, Papiers du Collège international de philosophie, Reconstitutions, 2000
- Information Flows in Kinship Networks, Mathematical Anthropology and Cultural Theory, vol. 1, novembre 2000
- Aristotle’s Theory of Price Revisited, Dialectical Anthropology, 1999, vol. 23
- "What do mathematicians teach us about the World? An anthropological perspective", Dialectical Anthropology], vol. 24, 1999
- The Chinese Room’s Secre, Homme, 1999, vol. 150, pp. 177–202
- An alternative neural network representation for conceptual knowledge, paper presented at the CONNEX conference of British Telecom, Martlesham Heath, January 1990
