= Sylvia Moss =

American writer and poet (born 1937)

Sylvia Moss (born 1937) is an American writer, editor, and poet based in Larchmont, New York.. She studied at Barnard College and the University of Wisconsin at Madison, obtaining a BA in 1957. Later she received an MSc degree from Columbia University in psychology. Moss collaborated with communication researcher Stewart Tubbs on several social science textbooks.

Moss worked as an editor at Random House. She co-edited the book China 5000 Years: Innovation and Transformation in the Arts, which was published by the Guggenheim Museum.

== Awards ==
- 1988 Whiting Award
- 1986 National Poetry Series, for Cities in Motion

== Works ==
- Cities in motion: poems. University of Illinois Press. 1987. ISBN 978-0-252-01280-8.
- Six Poets (Abel, 1999)
