= Stewart Tubbs =

American communication researcher (1943–2023)

- Born: September 6, 1943; Cleveland, Ohio, United States
- Died: February 18, 2023 (aged 79)
- Occupation: Academic staff
- Known for: Contributions to the fields of organizational communication and leadership

Academic background
- Education: Bowling Green State University, University of Kansas

Academic work
- Discipline: Communications
- Institutions: University of Kansas, Eastern Michigan University
- Notable ideas: Introducing a systems approach to small group communication

Stewart L. Tubbs (September 6, 1943 – February 18, 2023) was an American communication researcher, author, and academic administrator best known for his contributions to the fields of organizational communication and leadership. He spent the majority of his career at Eastern Michigan University, where he held an endowed professorship and served as dean of the College of Business. He is known for introducing a systems approach to small group communication in 1978 that includes explanations on the orientation, conflict, consensus, and closure in the group dynamics.

Tubbs was a celebrated textbook author, his works on human communication and small group communication, which were initially co-written with psychologist and poet Sylvia Moss, have gone through over ten editions since their first publication.

== Early life and education ==
Tubbs was born in Cleveland, Ohio, to Edwin and Mary Tubbs. He grew up in Lakewood, Ohio, where he attended Lakewood High School, graduating in 1961. He went on to earn a BS in biological sciences in 1965 and a MA in communication in 1966, both from Bowling Green State University. He subsequently completed his Ph.D. in Communication and Organizational Behavior at the University of Kansas in 1969.

== Career ==
Tubbs began his professional career at the University of Kansas in 1968, serving as assistant director of Community Leadership Development. He transitioned to teaching in 1969, joining General Motors Institute (now Kettering University) in Flint, Michigan, as an assistant professor of Communication and Organizational Behavior. He was promoted to associate professor in 1970 and to full Professor in 1974. In 1979, he was named the Harold P. Rodes Professor, a distinction he held until departing for Boise State University in 1983. Tubbs served there first as chairman of the Management Department, then as associate dean of the College of Business.

In 1986, he was appointed dean of the College of Business at Eastern Michigan University (EMU), a position he held until 1999. He was subsequently named the Darrell H. Cooper Endowed Professor of Leadership in EMU's College of Business, a role he held since the beginning of 1999 until his death. From 2002 to 2010, he also served as a visiting professor at Koç University in Istanbul, Turkey.

== Books ==
- Tubbs, Stewart L.; Moss, Sylvia (1974). Human communication: an interpersonal perspective. New York: Random House. ISBN 978-0-394-31634-5.
- Tubbs, Stewart L.; Baird, John William (1976). The open person: self-disclosure and personal growth. Interpersonal communication series. Columbus: Merrill. ISBN 978-0-675-08648-6.
- Tubbs, Stewart L.; Moss, Sylvia (1978). Interpersonal communication. New York: Random House. ISBN 978-0-394-32201-8.
- Tubbs, Stewart L.; Carter, Robert M., eds. (1978). Shared experiences in human communication. Rochelle Park, N.J: Hayden Book Co. ISBN 978-0-8104-6089-8.
- Tubbs, Stewart L. (2002). Leadership : communication, innovation and change. New York: McGraw-Hill. ISBN 978-0-07-286225-6.
- Tubbs, Stewart L. (2007). Keys to Leadership: 101 Steps to Success. McGraw Hill. ISBN 978-0-07-339615-6.
- Tubbs, Stewart L. (2012). A systems approach to small group interaction (11th ed.). New York: McGraw-Hill Humanities. ISBN 978-0-07-353432-9.
- Tubbs, Stewart L. (2013). Human communication: principles and contexts (13th ed.). New York: McGraw-Hill. ISBN 978-0-07-803678-1.
