= Mouvement Anti-Utilitariste dans les Sciences Sociales =

The Mouvement anti-utilitariste dans les sciences sociales ("Anti-utilitarian Movement in the Social Sciences") is a French intellectual movement. It is based around the ideology of "anti-utilitarianism", a critique of economism in social sciences and instrumental rationalism in moral and political philosophy. The movement was founded in 1981 by sociologist Alain Caillé, with the establishment of its interdisciplinary monthly journal Revue du MAUSS which is still published and edited by Caillé.

The journal covers topics in economics, anthropology, sociology and political philosophy from an anti-utilitarian perspective. His name is both an acronym and a tribute to the famous anthropologist Marcel Mauss. The movement works to promote a third paradigm, as a complement to, or replacement for holism and methodological individualism.

The movement began through conversations between Caillé and Swiss anthropologist Gerald Berthoud wondering why the economic theory of Marcel Mauss based on obligatory reciprocity and debt did not provide any possibilities of a "free gift" motivated by empathy rather than rational self-interest. The movement's early efforts considered the possibility of reintroducing an aspect of genuine interest in the welfare of others in economic theory. Among the economic policies suggested by the movement is the basic income guarantee a concept originally developed by Thomas Paine.

== Some regular contributors to the journal ==
- Paul Jorion
- Paul Ariès
- Genevieve Azam
- Gerald Berthoud
- Alain Caillé
- Philippe Chanial
- Jacques Dewitte
- Mary Douglas
- Denis Duclos
- Jean-Pierre Dupuy
- Michel Freitag
- Marcel Gauchet
- Philippe d'Iribarne
- Stephen Kalberg
- Serge Latouche
- Louis Maitrier
- Jean-Claude Michéa
- Thierry Paquot
- Lucien Scubla
- Camille Tarot
- Frederic Vandenberghe
- Raoul Vaneigem
- Jean-Pierre Voyer
