= Bona fide group =

Bona fide group theory is a theoretical perspective of communication in small groups that was initially developed by Linda Putnam and Cynthia Stohl in the 1990s. Intended to provide communication theorists with a valid model of small groups on which to conduct research, this perspective focuses on the principles of communication that take place within naturally formed social groups. This represented a shift in traditional research practices which had primarily consisted of studies on zero-history laboratory groups.

== Definition ==
Bona Fide groups are naturally occurring groups which exhibit two primary elements: (1) they exist with relatively stable yet permeable boundaries and (2) they are marked by interdependence with the immediate context of individual group members, and links between boundaries and context. These characteristics allow for important elements of small groups, such as fluctuation in group member commitment level and a shared sense of boundaries.

The nexus of Bona Fide group perspective is marked by "the point of contact or overlap between two or more groups"

== Application ==
In their call for research to move its focus toward bona fide groups, Putnam and Stohl argued that this model is more ecologically valid than alternative case studies, and as such, it gives a more accurate reading of how small groups behave on a day-to-day basis. Furthermore, since it has already helped develop current research settings, methods, and variables, it most certainly will continue to shape small group communication studies. In the time since this initial argument was proposed, social scientists have generally agreed with Putnam and Stohl, and have redirected much of their research to emphasize bona fide groups as a model of small group communication.

Bona Fide group leaders can display a number of characteristics to show an understanding of both a group's interdependence with its context and its permeable boundaries. Those in positions of oversight can do much to contribute to a group's success, regardless of whether the team is in a voluntary or secular setting, or has come together for a long or short period of time. Leaders must work towards creating a positive group culture, along with an emotional climate that is relaxed and warm. They must stay attuned to the individual needs of group members, always showing respect and dignifying them by preparing to lead the group. Leaders must also keep in mind that conflicts among group members may arise, and must be prepared to mediate those conflicts when necessary. In viewing group members as a team rather than an audience, leaders will encourage all members to participate in discussions and decision-making, "promote diversity of opinion, and actively foster critical thinking..." Through the Bona Fide Group perspective, working teams are seen as multi-faceted, emotional, and interconnected constructs that often operate towards achieving, not only their own goals, but also those of the organization within which the group finds itself in.
