= Power distance =

Strength of social hierarchy

Power distance is the extent to which unequal distributions of power are expected and accepted within societies, organizations, and institutions. It is studied in cross-cultural psychology and organizational studies. It is one of the dimensions in Geert Hofstede's cultural dimensions theory, developed from his research on employees of IBM in different countries. Hofstede's Power Distance Index (PDI) assigns comparative scores to countries according to the degree to which less powerful members accept unequal power relations; the scores are relative and are intended for comparison between societies.

Cultures and organizations described as having high power distance tend to have more centralized authority, pronounced hierarchies, and greater acceptance of autocratic or paternalistic leadership. In lower-power-distance settings, relationships between superiors and subordinates tend to be more consultative, authority more decentralized, and employees more willing to question or make suggestions to those above them. Later cross-cultural research has developed related approaches to the concept. The GLOBE Study treats power distance as one of nine cultural dimensions and examines the extent to which members of organizations and societies expect and agree that power should be shared unequally.

Power distance has been studied in relation to workplace management, leadership, employee voice and help-seeking, perceptions of organizational justice, and group creativity. Research discussed in the article also connects it with charitable behavior and with other cultural characteristics, particularly individualism and collectivism; Hofstede found national PDI scores to be positively correlated with collectivism and negatively associated with national wealth. Other work has examined possible relationships between power distance and democratic traditions, social class, religion, and immigration. The concept and Hofstede's method have also been criticized, including for using a Western framework to compare non-Western societies and for concentrating on relationships between managers and subordinates while giving less attention to other forms of inequality.

== Origin ==
Geert Hofstede was a Dutch psychologist and professor. He conducted a survey from the 1960s to the 1970s through IBM, a multinational computer manufacturing company, which was the main contribution to his development of the cultural dimensions theory.

In the study, Hofstede distributed questionnaires to various IBM employees in different countries relating to value differences within the company. He observed different power-distance levels and management styles and theorized four cultural dimensions: individualism/collectivism, masculinity/femininity, power distance and uncertainty avoidance.

Later research led to the discovery of a fifth and sixth dimension. Chinese sociologists identified long term/short term orientation as the fifth and a replica of Hofstede's study identified the sixth: indulgence/restraint. These dimensions were described in his popular work, "Culture's Consequences" (2001).

Hofstede created a measurement tool for the power-distance dimension. The Power Distance Index (PDI) measures to what degree a country, organization, or institution accepts the distribution of power and authority; it can be high, moderate, or low.

== Development and studies on the theory ==
=== Hofstede ===
==== Cultural dimensions theory ====
Hofstede developed the cultural dimensions theory, which is widely used as a crucial framework for cross-cultural communication. It is the earliest theory that could be quantified and is used to explain perceived differences between cultures and has been applied extensively in many fields, especially in cross-cultural psychology, international business, and cross-cultural communication. It was driven by the statistical procedure (also called "factor analysis") to make the development, based on the result of a global survey of the values of IBM employees conducted from 1967 and 1973. Hofstede's theory identified six dimensions of culture: power distance, individualism vs collectivism, uncertainty avoidance, masculinity vs femininity, short-term vs long-term orientation, and indulgence vs self-restraint.

Research has suggested that power distance can vary from culture to culture, which can be particularly prevalent in international corporations. A study performed by Xiaoshuang Lin et al. found that employees are more inclined to speak up under leaders deemed to be humble by their employees. Humility is a trait often associated with low-power distance cultures. The study found that an employee's self-conceptualization of power determined not only their workplace voice, but also their superior's humility. An environment such as this would also be akin to the collectivism dimension that Hofstede proposed.

==== Power Distance Index (PDI) ====
The PDI is designed to measure the extent to which power differs within the society, organization, and institutions is accepted by less powerful members. The index assigns a score to each country that indicates its level of power distance and dependent relationships. The PDI also represents society's level of inequality that is defined from below rather than from above. The PDI uses relative values; it is only useful when comparing countries.

Hofstede derived power-distance scores for three regions and fifty countries from the answers given by IBM employees in the same type of positions to the same questions. The PDI was calculated by:

1. Preparing three survey questions:

- How frequently, in the employees' experience, were they afraid to express disagreement with their managers? (mean score on a 1–5 scale from "very frequently" to "very seldom")
- Subordinates' perception of their boss's actual decision-making style (percentage choosing either the description of an autocratic or of a paternalistic style, out of four possible styles plus "none of these alternatives")
- Subordinates' preference for their boss's decision-making style (percentage preferring an autocratic or a paternalistic style, or, as type based on majority vote, but not a consultative style)

2. Pre-coding the answers to be represented as numbers (e.g. 1, 2, 3, 4...)

3. Computing the mean score for the answers of equal samples of people from each country or percentage that chose particular answers

4. Sorting the questions into groups—known as clusters or factors—by using a statistical procedure

5. Adding or subtracting the three scores after multiplying each with a fixed number

6. Adding another fixed number

Hofstede found that the emotional distance is relatively small in lower PDI cultures. There are more democratic or consultative relations between expecting and accepting power. People are relatively interdependent to the power holders, and there is a relatively low inequality of power distributed among the people. Under these circumstances, the decentralized authority and flat management structure is common but not universal, which suggests that managers and subordinates will, on average, be relatively less concerned with status, and the distribution of decision-making responsibility is extensive. Policies like the "open door" policy are implemented more often, which influence higher-ranking individuals to be more receptive to lower-ranking individuals, and subordinates to be more likely to challenge or give suggestions to their superiors. Examples of countries with low PDIs include the Netherlands, the United Kingdom, the United States, Germany, and the Nordic countries.

In higher PDI cultures, the power relations are paternalistic and autocratic, and centralized authority exists; there is a wide gap or emotional distance which is perceived to exist among people at different levels of the hierarchy. There is considerable dependence (also known as counter-dependence) on individuals who hold power. In the workplace, subordinates are willing to accept their inferior positions, and superiors may not ask for broad participation in the decision-making process. Higher PDI cultures usually adopt an autocratic leadership style, which means subordinates may be unlikely to approach and contradict their bosses directly. Countries with high power distance cultures usually believe that there is nothing wrong with inequality and everyone has specific positions. China, Belgium, France, Malaysia, and the Arab world are regarded as examples of countries or regions with high PDI cultures.

Hofstede's study is limited by two factors: neutralization and analyzing non-Western countries with a Western methodology. Each stage of the research process makes the unneutral seem neutral. The questionnaire reflects a large power distance: its questions were explicitly designed to resolve the normative concerns of researchers; it primarily served the concerns of those who needed to do comparative analysis and created it through "coercing a culturally distinct axis of comparison" on a variety of employees. Additionally, the questionnaire adopted a Western methodology to analyze non-Western countries and was relatively selective in representing the inequality within Western countries. For example, the PDI concentrated on the boss and subordinate relationship, which could be seen as biased, as it ignores other forms of western inequality. Apparently, the questions failed to measure the racial, colonial, and broader class inequalities that should be taken into account when measuring power distance.

=== Haire, Ghiselli, and Porter ===
Mason Haire, Edwin Ghiselli, and Lyman Porter explored the differences in preferences for power among different cultures with remarkable outcomes, without yet mentioning the concept of power distance. They conducted their study with a questionnaire, which was based on a modified version of Maslow's hierarchy of needs. The aim of the questionnaire was to evaluate how managers from 14 countries were satisfied regarding their needs when they were in their current positions. The dimensions that were linked to power distance across cultures in their questionnaire were autonomy and self-actualization.

In accordance with the responses to the questions in their questionnaire, the 14 countries were clustered into five main groups, which Haire et al. labeled Nordic-European (Denmark, Germany, Norway, and Sweden), Latin-European (Belgium, France, Italy, and Spain), Anglo-American (England and the United States), Developing (Argentina, Chile, and India), and Japan. The analysis used various mean standardized scores that the five groups presented with respect to autonomy and self-actualization; positive figures described greater satisfaction of need than for the average manager across all 14 countries, while negative figures described lesser satisfaction.

National group	Autonomy	Self-actualization
Nordic European	.36	.25
Latin European	-.16	.23
Anglo American	-.14	-.09
Developing	-.25	-.11
Japan	-.25	-.11

=== Mulder ===
Another major study of power distance was undertaken by Mauk Mulder, whose work was based on the premise that as societies become weaker in power distance, the underprivileged will tend to reject their power dependency. Mulder's laboratory experiments in the social and organizational context of the Netherlands, a low power-distance culture, concluded that people attempted to seek "power distance reduction". He found that:

- More privileged individuals tend to try to preserve or to broaden their power distance from subordinates.
- The larger their power distance is from a subordinate, the more the power holder tends to try to increase that distance.
- Less powerful individuals try to decrease the power distance between themselves and their superiors.
- The smaller the power distance, the more likely it is that less powerful individuals will try to reduce that distance.

=== After Hofstede – the GLOBE Study ===
Following Hofstede, the Global Leadership and Organizational Behavior Effectiveness (GLOBE) project defined "power distance" as "the degree to which members of an organization or society expect and agree that power should be shared unequally". Power distance was further analyzed as one of the nine cultural dimensions explained in the GLOBE Research Program, which was conceived in 1990 by Robert J. House of the Wharton School of Business at the University of Pennsylvania.

Given the premise that leader effectiveness is contextual, the research was conducted by believing that the social and organizational values, norms and beliefs of those who are being led are closely connected to the effectiveness of the leader. GLOBE measures the practices and values that exist at the levels of industry (financial services, food processing, telecommunications), organization (several in each industry), and society (62 cultures). The results are presented in the form of quantitative data based on responses from about 17,000 managers from 951 organizations functioning in 62 societies throughout the world, which shows how each of the 62 societies scores on nine major attributes of cultures, including Power Distance, and six major global leader behaviors.

Regarding power distance, GLOBE researches cultural influences on power distance values, practices and other aspects, including "Roots of Power Distance", "The Psychological Stream and Power", and "The Cross-Cultural Stream and Power Distance". It also investigates how family power values are taught and makes a comparison of high versus low power distance societies.

When discussing "The Cross-Cultural Stream and Power Distance", four primary factors affecting a society's level of power distance are explained separately: the predominant religion or philosophy, the tradition of democratic principles of government, the existence of a strong middle class, and the proportion of immigrants in a society's population. Connections exist among the four fundamental phenomena, but the study concluded that a society's main beliefs, values, and religion, will have the strongest and longest lasting influence on power distance, which would be moderated by a democratic tradition and the existence of a strong middle class to some extent. Both factors are expected to narrow power distance. Finally, a large proportion of immigrants in a given society makes the low power distance trend stronger in all circumstances presented above. The study also concludes that regardless of religion, any society that does not have a tradition of democracy or a significant middle class will have a substantially high power distance levels.

== Applications and effects ==
Power distance is a significant dimension in cross-cultural environments that it unconsciously influences people's behavior in different countries, which contributes to so-called "cultural norms", which are shaped by perceptions and acceptance of power inequality to a certain degree. These "cultural norms" lead to various reactions when facing same situations or in the same environment. However, there are some consequences that result from acquiescence in inequality in organizations and societies, especially for high power distance countries.

=== The workplace ===
==== Effects on management style ====
In organizations with high power distance, employees acknowledge their lesser standing, and are respectful and submissive towards their superiors, who in turn are more likely to give orders rather than consult with their employees while making decisions. Status symbols are often displayed and flaunted. Employers or managers would not have meals together with their subordinates, and might have private facilities such as rooms, parking lots, or elevators. Having a high level of education is important to climb the corporate ladder, and the higher-ranking members of the organization are often paid much more than their subordinates when compared with companies with lower power distance.

In low power distance organizations, superiors are not as concerned with status symbols and would be more open to employee discussion and participation. Employees are less submissive to their superiors, and are more likely to make themselves heard or to challenge the management.

==== The relationship between leadership and voice behavior ====
The ability for employees to speak up is described as their voice behavior and expression, which is dependent upon the leadership style as well as the power distance. Sheng-Min Liu and Jian-Qiao Liao developed a questionnaire that asked 495 subordinates (engineers) and 164 leaders (senior engineers and project managers) to determine the outcome of subordinate voice behavior based on the leadership style, which is influenced by power distance because of the closeness in proximity and structure of those cultures. The study finds that low power distance leaders facilitate a change-oriented environment for subordinates to discuss their ideas and concerns which leads to their admiration.

The study finds that in high power distance businesses, subordinates obey the gap between them and their leaders, and rarely interact with their superiors. The study further confirms that the ideas and solutions in this power index are given to them by their leaders, so it seems contradictory for those in the high-power distance to speak up about their concerns or ideas because they are accustomed to direction. The contradiction of the high-power index shows that it weakens the leader–subordinate relationship causing a lack of expression. Thus, voice behavior and expression rely on the transformational leadership style often seen in low power distance cultures. The study concludes that the leadership style which is based on power distance culture correlates with the tools given to an employee to speak up in his or her environment.

==== Effects on employee behavior ====
In business, power distance can be defined as the acceptance (by employees) of the relationship between the highest and lowest ranked members in an organization. Studies have suggested that employees in low power distance workplaces directly impact the distribution of office power. This could be due in part to the employees possessing more power (and therefore, more freedom to make changes) than in a high-power distance setting. In addition, the opposite has been suggested for employees in high power distance environments, with superiors not varying much in their position. Culture can have an effect on this, as lower-level employees in high power distance cultures may be unable to have a large impact on their workplace.

In high power distance regions, people in higher positions hold great amounts of power with little challenge. The hierarchy and authority empower employers and supervisors with more rights of resource allocation, rewards, and punishment, which reinforce their status and enable them to lead and guide their subordinates autocratically. The hierarchical differentiation between the top and the bottom gradually creates an invisible gap in the workplace, where subordinates tend to build greater sensitivity and cautiousness when communicating with their supervisors.

It is a common phenomenon that junior employees turn to their seniors for help and advice when getting into a new environment. Yet, some researchers recently attested that employees and junior staff from high power distance countries are less likely to seek help from their supervisors. One of the reasons is that lower ranking staff have few chances and little time to meet the high ranking managers in person, as subordinates are usually only able to reach their immediate supervisors. It is also widely believed that subordinates asking for help equates to incompetence or a lack of ability, which subdues themselves into unfavorable circumstances. Some supervisors who are incapable of solving more complicated problems will become suspicious of their subordinates, regard the problems as a challenge to their status and capabilities, or even as humiliation from the lower ranking staff. Such climates have gradually reinforced employees to think that it is more effective and efficient to deal with difficulties by themselves, rather than talking to their managers.

In a high power distance environment, supervisors tend to pay more attention on tasks instead of employees, who are the main focus for supervisors in a low power distance environment. Apparently, task orientation emphasizes heavily on daily work completion and performance efficiency, yet the top-bottom relationship grows far more slowly since there is a lack of communication beyond work, which in turn reduces subordinates' willingness of seeking help from supervisors. Compared to low power distance countries, equality is embraced by the society that power is minimized to a large extent, where authority and hierarchy are not highlighted and supervisors are accessible and willing to build close relationship with subordinates, whose worries of any harm are turned down when seeking help from the top.

The beliefs employees hold regarding procedural justice—defined as the level of fair treatment by the superiors in the organization toward the employees—shape the nature of their relationships with authority. Fair treatment in the workplace is incumbent upon three established criteria: gender, trust amongst authority, and the psychological contract fulfillment—the employee's idea of receiving the benefits promised by the workplace. Employee perception of procedural justice is affected by power distance and gender. In low power distance cultures employees are more likely to have a strong personal connection and a better understanding of the authority they are dealing with. Negative behavior in a low power distance culture increases when organizations treat them poorly because they lack the characteristics of submitting humbly before authority. Therefore, the relationship between employees and superiors are outlined by procedural justice and trust in authority in low power distance cultures. In contrast, employees in high power distance cultures are less likely to be themselves around authority; They are also less sensitive to insulting remarks, and more likely to accept an erroneous action from authority without consideration of fair treatment (procedural justice). For both low and high power distance cultures, they perceived fair treatment to be a fulfillment of the psychological contract made by the organization.

=== In charitable behavior ===
According to research, people from high power distance countries are generally less responsible towards charitable behaviors than people from low power distance countries. The explanation for this phenomenon is that the rooted perception and acceptance of inequality somehow dampens their sensitivity to any unfair or inappropriate situations, which they may consider as a normal social circumstance and simply accept it rather than making a change. Cumulatively, the more inequality they accept, the less unconformity they will notice, and the less responsibilities they will eventually take. The consequence is high power distance enlarging the gap between human beings in terms of relations and wealth conditions. Conversely, people in low power distance countries are more sensitive towards any unequal phenomena, and their in-acceptance of dissonance endows them with a greater sense of responsibility for adjusting or correcting the problems in person.

==== Influence of controllable/uncontrollable needs ====
The types of needs influence people's charitable behavior regardless of their power distance backgrounds. The needs generated are classified into controllable and uncontrollable categories, where the occurrence of the former is due to a lack of effort, while the latter occurs from unforeseeable events such as natural disasters. The ability of whether individuals are able to control the situations affects how they will react to the rising needs.

The level of power distance influences a society's reaction towards controllable needs. People with high power distance backgrounds perceive most of the issues as rightful inequality, and are reluctant to get themselves involved with "troubles", and usually ignore them. Conversely, low power distance societies are intolerant with unfairness and are more likely to make an effort in eliminating dissonance in every possibility.

People tend to be more responsive and willing to assist when others suffer from uncontrollable circumstances. It is assumed that people consider that the aid for uncontrollable needs will not greatly change societal rightful inequality, and hence generous assistance and help will be offered to those in need regardless of power distance background. In such circumstances, a sense of duty is more likely to be raised, where people tend to undertake charitable behaviors.

==== Influence of communal/exchange relationship norms ====
The relationship norms behind the needs also affect the sense of responsibility. The types of relationships are mainly classified as exchange relationships, in which people are expecting a reasonable privilege or benefit in return for offering aid; and communal relationships, where those giving assistance are wholeheartedly and generously taking care of those in need without any expectation of reciprocation. According to research, people are more likely to refuse to aid when encountering needs associated with exchange relationships rather than needs with communal relationships. As such, Karen Page Winterich and Yinlong Zhang recommended that charitable organizations in high power distance countries should stress the significance of uncontrollable needs or salient communal relationship norms, through which the populace are more easily motivated to make a difference on social inequality.

== Examples of high and low power-distance cultures and their effects ==
Power distance affects cultures all over the world and the interactions different cultures have with each other.

Malaysia is a country that scores high on the PDI. Due to high power distance, it is a culture where one may not question someone in power like a manager, a professor, or a government official, because authority is valued and power is not equally distributed. When this country is compared to the United States, a country that scores lower on the Power Distance Index, there are many differences one may come across. The United States, having moderate power distance, allows a person to question a professor or give ideas to a boss.

Due to many changes and advances in today's world, some organizations have expanded globally and send workers from country to country or students abroad. If an American manager travels to Malaysia to manage a company, they will run into situations that would be surprising to them. The American manager may ask the workers for their opinions on how to do something or improve something and the Malaysians may just sit still and not speak up because they do not feel as if they have the authority to do so.

Egypt is another country that scores high on the Power Distance Index. Students in this country tend to respect their professors and not question them. The country also has exams that determine whether or not a student can continue studying; by doing this, a level of authority that cannot be surpassed unless done correctly is created. Students from this country when compared to students in Canada, a country that scores lower on the Power Distance Index, cannot question a professor on a grade. Therefore, they would require clear guidelines of what is expected of them in order to succeed. Many international students experience culture shock when they study abroad in the United States, for example. They may be unfamiliar with a variety of things such as the differences in academic writing in America or the informality of certain relationships with "authority figures" like professors.

== Individualism/collectivism and power distance ==
Different cultures have different views on power distance. Something that is related to and overlaps with power distance is individualism vs. collectivism. Hofstede is the scholar behind both power distance and individualism and collectivism. Hofstede defines collectivism as "...a preference for a tightly knit social framework in which individuals can expect their relatives, clan, or other in-group to look after them, in exchange for unquestioning loyalty" and individualism as "...a preference for a loosely knit social framework in a society in which individuals are supposed to take care of themselves and their immediate families only". An example of an individualistic country is the United States, as people tend to care more about their own well-being than the good of the whole group. It is contrasted with China, a collectivist country where people tend to worry more about the overall well-being of the group and put that at a higher importance than their personal wants or needs. Individualism and collectivism relate to power distance because they influence how a culture behaves in society.

Individualism, collectivism, and power distance can be linked together in different ways. They are typically studied together because overall in scoring, a country's PDI score is positively correlated with its degree of collectivism. This is explained as individualistic countries being typically focused on an individual and their desires, where power status has a less significant role, and collectivist countries focusing on the collective good. Hofstede found that individualism, collectivism, and power distance are greatly correlated to a nation's wealth. Wealthy countries usually score high for individualism and low on the Power Distance Index, while poorer countries score high for both collectivism and the PDI.

A study conducted by Yuan Feirong and Jing Zhou demonstrates how individualism and collectivism correlate with power distance as well as its impact on creativity in a conceptual model. The model examines the creativity of groups based on group member interactions that occur in face to face meeting or teleconferences, and individual employee contributions to the group. Cultures high on the PDI typically interact and speak less to group members, as they rely heavily on the person with the highest status in the group to determine and make final decisions. Therefore, high power cultures "may not always foster creativity, and can sometimes undermine it. They do not function in actual teams." Meanwhile, for low power distance cultures it is crucial for each individual to have a say in the overall group function which has proven to increase creativity and develop great innovations, and creativity in groups "highlights the value of group member cognitive diversity". Power distance influences cultures based on the index creating different environments for group creativity and interactions.

== Linked factors ==
=== Democracy ===
It has been asserted that democratic governments occur most commonly among low power distance societies, where it is not ingrained into the minds of the people since young age that there are unquestionable hierarchies in life that should not be disputed. It has been found that the "ideological breach between labor and conservatives" is polarized in high power distance societies, while in low power distance cultures, people tend to try to attain balance between the two extremes in order to avoid damaging and draining conflicts.

== See also ==
- Hofstede's cultural dimensions theory
