= Alain Caillé =

French sociologist and economist

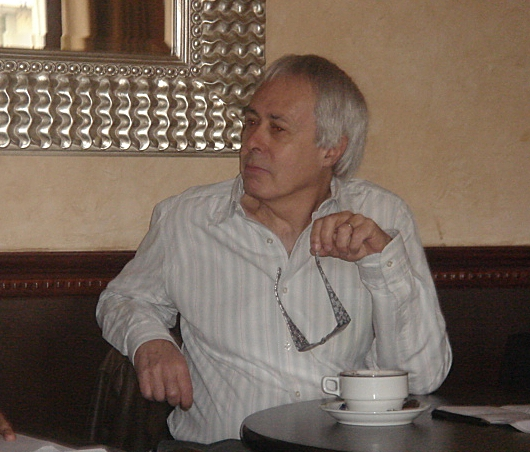
Alain Caillé in 2008

Allain Caillé (French: [kaje]; born 2 June 1944, Paris) is a French sociologist and economist. He is Professor of sociology at the University of Paris X Nanterre. He is a founding member of the Anti-Utilitarian Movement in the Social Sciences (MAUSS) and editor of the movement's monthly journal "Revue du Mauss".

== Publications ==
Caillé's many books have been translated into many languages among them English, Arabic, Italian, Spanish, Romanian and Portuguese.

- Splendeurs et Misères des sciences sociales (Droz, Genève, 1986).
- Critique de la Raison Utilitaire (La Découverte, Paris, 1989).
- L'Esprit du Don (w. Jacques Godbout), La Découverte, 1992.
- La démission des clercs. La crise des sciences sociales et l'oubli du politique (La Découverte, 1993)
- Au-delà du salariat universel; Temps choisi et revenu de citoyenneté (Démosthène/M.A.U.S.S. Caen, 1994).
- Don, intérêt et désintéressement. Bourdieu, Mauss, Platon et quelques autres. (La Découverte, 1994).
- Le tournant de décembre (w. Jean-Pierre Le Goff), La Découverte, 1996.
- Anthropologie du don. Le tiers paradigme, Desclée de Brouwer, 2000.
- Association, démocratie et société civile (w. Jean-Louis Laville, Philippe Chanial et alii), La Découverte, 2001.
- Bonheur et utilité. Histoire de la philosophie morale et politique (Edited by Alain Caillé, Christian Lazzeri et Michel Senellart), Éditions La Découverte/ 750 pages, 2001
- Paix et démocratie (w. Boutros Boutros-Ghali), 2003, UNESCO, Paris.
- Dé-penser l'économique. Contre le fatalisme. La Découverte, 2005.
