= Global leadership =

Interdisciplinary field of study

Global leadership is the interdisciplinary study of the key elements that future leaders in all realms of the personal experience should acquire to effectively familiarize themselves with the psychological, physiological, geographical, geopolitical, anthropological and sociological effects of globalization. Global leadership occurs when an individual or individuals navigate collaborative efforts of different stakeholders through environmental complexity towards a vision by leveraging a global mindset. Today, global leaders must be capable of connecting "people across countries and engage them to global team collaboration in order to facilitate complex processes of knowledge sharing across the globe" Personality characteristics, as well as a cross-cultural experience, appear to influence effectiveness in global leaders.

== Cross-cultural competence (3C) ==
Daniel P. McDonald, executive director of Research, Development and Strategic Initiatives at the Defense Equal Opportunity Management Institute and his team established for the U.S. Department of Defense a set of 40 general cross-cultural learning statements (knowledge, skills, and personal characteristics) were recommended by a DoD focus group in order to foster the career development of cross-cultural competence in military and civilian personnel. The roles of aptitude and appropriate training components in the development of global leadership were reviewed by Caligiuri in 2006.

- Willingness to engage
- Cognitive flexibility & openness
- Emotional regulation
- Tolerance of uncertainty
- Self-efficacy
- Ethnocultural empathy

== Geert Hofstede ==
Geert Hofstede has performed research for several decades that continues to impact research in global and international arenas of global leadership. Hofstede's research is primarily focused on how values in the workplace are influenced by culture. According to him, all behaviours are determined by culture. In his definition; culture is ‘the collective programming of the mind distinguishing the members of one group or category of people from others.’ To conduct his research, he analyzed a large database of employee value scores collected within IBM between the years 1967 and 1973. There are over 70 countries in the data. Hofstede's primary tenants of culture differentiation are summed up through his research more elaborately but primarily consist of In his model, he identified six dimensions of national culture based on his research. Those dimensions are also used to differentiate countries from each other, based on how countries score on the six dimensions. The scale of scores ranges from 0 to 100. If a score is below 50 it is considered Low and if it is higher than 50 it is considered High in that dimension. Here, although countries are represented with a score, the scores are relative and cannot represent unique individuals. In other words, ‘culture can be only used meaningfully by comparison.’ The relevant scores are proven to be stable over time. Forces that cause cultures to shift are global and therefore there is something affecting the culture in a country, it actually affects many countries at the same time in the world. The model consists of six dimensions; which are Power Distance, Individualism, Masculinity vs Femininity, Uncertainty Avoidance, Long Term Orientation vs Short Term Normative Orientation and Indulgence vs Restraint. Furthermore, he has published several books and academic articles on the subject in order to light the way for global business leaders as well as academic researchers.

=== Hofstede's cultural dimensions ===
- Power Distance Index (PDI), an index which measures the less powerful members of organizations and institutions and how they accept and expect that power is distributed unequally. Power distance indicates how society handles inequalities among people. Countries that have high power distance accept the hierarchical order in which people are in different levels/places and there is no further justification. Therefore, inequalities of power and wealth distribution are allowed in society. On the other hand, countries having low power distance support equality and demand justification for inequalities of power. In these societies, equality and opportunity for everyone is highly reinforced.
- Individualism (ADV) as is juxtaposed to its opposite, collectivism, which is the measure to which individuals are comfortably integrated into groups. The society's point of view on this dimension is reflected in whether people's self-image is defined in terms of ‘I’ or ‘We’. Or similarly, it is the difference between the individual above the society vs society above the individual. In individualistic countries, there is a high valuation of people's time, their need for independence and their privacy. On the other hand, collectivist countries are more supportive of harmony in society.
- Masculinity (MAS) versus femininity. Masculinity refers to the degree that which a society values achievement, being the best, heroism, assertiveness, and material rewards for success. In contrast, femininity refers to the values of cooperation, modesty, caring for the weak and quality of life. In a business context, Masculinity versus Femininity may identify “tough versus tender” cultures.
- Uncertainty Avoidance Index (UAI) deals with a society's tolerance for uncertainty and ambiguity; it ultimately refers to man's search for Truth. Countries having high uncertainty avoidance have very strict rules of belief and behaviour and they are intolerant of ideas or behaviour otherwise. Countries having low uncertainty avoidance have more relaxed attitudes.
- Long-Term Orientation (LTO) values associated with Long Term Orientation are thrift and perseverance; values associated with Short Term Orientation are respected for tradition, fulfilling social obligations, and protecting one's 'face'. This dimension is created to understand the long term orientation of mainly Asian cultures and their respect for tradition. In the business world, long-term orientation and short term orientation are referred to as being pragmatic and normative.
- Indulgence (IVR) versus restraint refers to the extent to which members of a society try to control their desires and impulses. Whereas indulgent societies have a tendency to allow relatively free gratification of basic and natural human desires related to enjoying life and having fun, restrained societies have a conviction that such gratification needs to be curbed and regulated by strict norms.

== Project GLOBE ==
The GLOBE (Global Leadership and Organizational Behavior Effectiveness) research project took Hofstede's original 1980 research findings (Hofstede, 1980) and dedicated an entire academic effort to exploring the differences between cultures (Hofstede, 1980). “Conceived in 1991 by Robert J. House of the Wharton School of the University of Pennsylvania, and led by Professor House, the GLOBE Project directly involved 170 “country co-investigators” based in 62 of the world's cultures as well as a 14-member group of coordinators and research associates. This international team collected data from 17,300 middle managers in 951 organizations. They used qualitative methods to assist their development of quantitative instruments.” The research identified nine cultural competencies and grouped the 62 countries into ten convenient societal clusters (Javidan & Dastmalchian, 2009).

=== Globe cultural clusters ===
The GLOBE researchers used acquired data to put nations into cultural clusters that are grouped based upon cultural similarities due to shared geography and climate conditions, which all influence perceptions and behavior:

Anglo Cultures England, Australia, South Africa (white sample), Canada, New Zealand, Ireland, United States

Arab Cultures Algeria, Qatar, Morocco, Egypt, Kuwait, Libya, Tunisia, Lebanon, Syria, Yemen, Jordan, Iraq, UAE, Bahrain, Saudi Arabia, Oman

Confucian Asia Taiwan, Singapore, Hong Kong, South Korea, China, Japan, Vietnam

Eastern Europe Hungary, Bulgaria, Romania, Czech Republic, Slovakia, Poland, Lithuania, Latvia, Estonia, Serbia, Greece, Slovenia, Albania, Russia

Germanic Europe Dutch-speaking (Netherlands, Belgium and Dutch-speaking France) German-speaking (Austria, German-speaking Switzerland, Germany, South Tyrol, Liechtenstein)

Latin America Costa Rica, Venezuela, Ecuador, Mexico, El Salvador, Colombia, Guatemala, Bolivia, Brazil, Argentina

Latin Europe Italy, Portugal, Spain, France, Switzerland (French and Italian speaking)

Nordic Europe Finland, Sweden, Denmark, Norway

Southern Asia India, Pakistan, Bangladesh, Indonesia, Malaysia, Thailand, Iran, Philippines, Turkey

Sub-Sahara Africa Namibia, Zambia, Zimbabwe, South Africa (Black Sample), Nigeria

=== GLOBE cultural competencies ===
The nine GLOBE cultural competencies are:

1. Performance orientation - refers to the extent to which an organization or society encourages and rewards group members for performance improvement and excellence.
2. Assertiveness orientation - is the degree to which individuals in organizations or societies are assertive, confrontational, and aggressive in social relationships.
3. Future orientation - is the degree to which individuals in organizations or societies engage in future-oriented behaviours such as planning, investing in the future, and delaying gratification.
4. Humane orientation - is the degree to which individuals in organizations or societies encourage and reward individuals for being fair, altruistic, friendly, generous, caring, and kind to others.
5. Bureaucratic collectivism I: Institutional collectivism - reflects the degree to which organizational and societal institutional practices encourage and reward collective distribution of resources and collective action.
6. Collectivism II: In-group collectivism - reflects the degree to which individuals express pride, loyalty and cohesiveness in their organizations or families.
7. Gender egalitarianism - is the extent to which an organization or a society minimizes gender role differences and gender discrimination.
8. Power distance - is defined as the degree to which members of an organization or society expect and agree that power should be unequally shared.
9. Uncertainty avoidance - is defined as the extent to which members of an organization or society strive to avoid uncertainty by reliance on social norms, rituals, and bureaucratic practices to alleviate the unpredictability of future events.

After an extensive review of the research, the GLOBE strategically grouped over 21 primary leadership dimensions into six encompassing dimensions of global leadership and made a recommendation about how the dimensions of culture and leadership could distinguish the influences of one country from another.

=== Culturally endorsed implicit leadership (CLT) ===
The six Globe dimensions of culturally endorsed implicit leadership (CLT) are:

1. Charismatic/value-based – characterized by demonstrating integrity, decisiveness, and performance-oriented by appearing visionary, inspirational and self-sacrificing, but can also be toxic and allow for autocratic commanding.
2. Team-oriented – characterized by diplomatic, administratively competent, team collaboration and integration. A toxic leader would be malevolent alienating the team, but driving cohesion
3. Self-protective – characterized by self-centred, face-saving, procedural behaviour capable of inducing conflict when necessary while being conscious of status
4. Participative – characterized by (non-autocratic) participative behaviour that is supportive of those who are being led.
5. Human orientation – characterized by modesty and compassion for others in an altruistic fashion
6. Autonomous – being able to function without constant consultations.

== Gender and Global Leadership ==
Gender-related processes affect global leadership dynamics. Scholars suggest that gender roles acquired through gender-role socialization contribute to a person's individual balance of agentic and communal behaviors. Effective global leaders are able to balance these behaviors regardless of their sex. Some scholars have pointed to Christine Lagarde and Indra Nooyi as examples of women who demonstrate both categories of behaviors.

Gender beliefs, values, and attitudes also vary across cultures and leaders are more successful when they and their followers hold congruent beliefs about appropriate gender roles. Gender also carries ascribed status that influences access to power and resources. In societies where men are ascribed the highest social status, other genders will not get as much time speaking in groups, be excluded from majority networks, have their failures accentuated and accomplishments devalued, and will generally have more difficulty gaining access to power and resources. Access to other forms of status, such as family connections or education, can mitigate this disparity for individuals. Examples of prominent women global leaders from societies with traditional views about women's roles include Benazir Bhutto and Indira Gandhi.

Globalization continues to thrive and change, and the concept of global leadership will adapt to a world being made incrementally smaller.
