= Uncertainty avoidance =

Societal concept

In cross-cultural psychology, uncertainty avoidance is how cultures differ on the amount of tolerance they have of unpredictability. Uncertainty avoidance is one of five key qualities or dimensions measured by the researchers who developed the Hofstede model of cultural dimensions to quantify cultural differences across international lines and better understand why some ideas and business practices work better in some countries than in others. According to Geert Hofstede, "The fundamental issue here is how a society deals with the fact that the future can never be known: Should we try to control it or just let it happen?"

The uncertainty avoidance dimension relates to the degree to which individuals of a specific society are comfortable with uncertainty and the unknown. Countries displaying strong uncertainty avoidance index (UAI) believe and behave in a strict manner. Individuals belonging to those countries also avoid unconventional ways of thinking and behaving. Weak UAI societies display more ease in regards to uncertainty. People in cultures with high uncertainty avoidance try to minimize the occurrence of unknown and unusual circumstances and to proceed with careful changes step by step by planning and by implementing rules, laws and regulations. In contrast, low uncertainty avoidance cultures accept and feel comfortable in unstructured situations or changeable environments and try to have as few rules as possible. People in these cultures tend to be more pragmatic and more tolerant of change.

When it comes to the tolerance of unpredictability, the areas which uncertainty avoidance deals with the most are technology, law, and religion. Technology assists with the uncertainty done by nature with new developments. Law defends the uncertainty of behavior by the people with rules that are set. Religion accepts the uncertainty people cannot get protected from. Individuals use their beliefs to get through their uncertainties.

== Key concepts ==
There is a wide scale on where specific cultures fall under the uncertainty avoidance. Three types of uncertainty avoidance are high, low, and moderate uncertainty avoidance. Hofstede's uncertainty avoidance scale shows the want to reduce any visible uncertainty that is placed in the life of a person.

=== High uncertainty avoidance ===
There are many ways to detect if someone has a high amount of uncertainty avoidance. Typically, the use of formality in interaction with others, dependence of formalized policies and procedures, apparent resistance to change, and intolerance of nontraditional ways are all characteristics of high uncertainty avoidance.

Also, people from high uncertainty avoidance cultures demonstrate higher stress and anxiety levels. These individuals have a high value on control, which means that having a set structure in everything of their life helps. The use of rigid rules assists them with defining what they believe in and how they behave. The development of new ideas makes them uncomfortable and only take risks that they know have high success rates. Older people in high UA are highly respected and feared. When children are being taught the beliefs of their culture, they cannot question them.

People in high uncertainty avoidance societies may be afraid of people who are different from them. They may show signs of Xenophobia.

==== High uncertainty avoidance countries ====
Some of the highest uncertainty avoidance countries include Finland, Germany, Greece, Guatemala, Japan, Mexico, Portugal, and South Korea.

=== Low uncertainty avoidance ===
In contrast, people can also exhibit characteristics of low uncertainty avoidance. Unlike high UA, those with a low level use informality in interaction with others, they often rely on informal norms and behaviors in most matters. Also, they will show moderate resistance to change.

Individuals that come from a culture with low UA care about letting the future come without the control or plan of it. Rules that are placed do not have an influence on them. Those with a low UA believe that it is okay to question the people in higher positions. They have lower stress and anxiety rates. Younger people in low UA are respected and when they are being taught the beliefs within their culture, they do not have to follow them right away. When new ideas are brought up, they are open-minded when hearing about them. People from low UA don't find situations that aren't clear as problems that might cause them trouble. Originality will have higher value and likely to be taken into consideration.

Additionally, people with low uncertainty avoidance do not have any difficulty with interacting with people who are different from them.

==== Low uncertainty avoidance countries ====
Some of the lowest uncertainty avoidance countries include Jamaica, Denmark, Singapore, Sweden, and Ireland.

=== Moderate uncertainty avoidance ===
People of moderate uncertainty avoidance cultures take some characteristics from both types of avoidance. The people with moderate UA are those who live in the United States and Canada.

=== Risk ===
Uncertainty avoidance is commonly mistakenly associated with risk avoidance. However, UAI does not deal with risk avoidance. In fact, it deals with the habits and rituals in which a society feels comfortable practicing.

== Applications ==
=== Business ===
David S. Baker and Kerry D. Carson performed a study to evaluate uncertainty avoidance among field sales personnel. They selected 155 subjects from the United States, Canada, United Kingdom, Australia, and New Zealand. Their research pointed towards individuals using both attachment and avoidance to lower their uncertainty avoidance in the workplace. People who were high on uncertainty avoidance and those low on it behaved differently. Sales personnel who were low on uncertainty avoidance saw no need to attach with their team or adapt to their environment, but those high on it used both avoidance and attachment to deal with situations. Those who reported moderate levels of uncertainty avoidance preferred to use adaptation rather than attachment when needed.

In a study conducted by Nelson O. Ndubisi, Naresh K. Malhotra, Dilber Ulas, and Gibson C. Ndubisi it was found that customer loyalty is less in countries with low uncertainty avoidance. Additionally, it can be inferred from the study that customer trust is higher in countries with high uncertainty avoidance.

It is also believed that the uncertainty avoidance index (UAI) has a significant effect on consumers' acceptance of unfamiliar brands in the retail market. Brand familiarity, celebrity endorsement, and cultural differences all have an effect on determining an individual's UAI. Eliane Karsaklian has studied the effect UAI has on consumers' attitudes towards familiar and unfamiliar brands in different cultures (specifically American and French). She concludes that uncertainty avoidance has a deep role in shaping consumers' attitudes towards brands. However, the claim that UAI (or any other dimension) has an "effect" is inconsistent with Hofstede's acknowledgement in his reply to Brendan McSweeney (Human Relations, 55.11 - 2002) that "dimensions do not exist" and therefore cannot be causal i.e. they cannot have effects. Like many studies, Karsaklian analysis confuses correlation with causation.

Hofstede concluded that people in high uncertainty avoidance societies may avoid changing jobs. Whereas, people in low uncertainty avoidance societies may feel more at ease with changing jobs.

=== Politics ===
In politics, cultures with high uncertainty avoidance citizens tend to have low interest in politics and citizen protests are repressed. This is because political unrest would bring about changes which the majority would not be comfortable with. There also tends to be many laws with laws being more specific as to avoid any uncertainty in the interpretation and to guide which behavior is acceptable. On the other side of the spectrum in cultures with low uncertainty avoidance citizens tend to be very interested in politics as it serves as a tool for change. Protests are accepted as another tool for change and laws are general.

=== Crime ===
In 2005 Robert M. Wiedenhaefer conducted a study on the factors contributing to terrorism. Wiedenhaefer concluded that uncertainty avoidance has a high association with terrorism. He asserted through his analysis that uncertainty avoidance is the strongest predictor in such crimes.

Ellen Giebels, Miriam Oostinga, Paul Taylor, and Joanna Curtis conducted a study in February 2017 on the impact between police-civilian interactions. They hypothesized that a clear and more communicative style of interaction would be used by high uncertainty avoidance negotiators. Their study supported this hypothesis. In addition, they found that uncertainty avoidance highly influences interactions between said individuals.

=== Education ===
In cultures with high uncertainty avoidance, teachers are viewed as having all the answers and learning is structured. In cultures with low uncertainty avoidance, teachers are not necessarily viewed as all knowing and the learning is open minded with less focus on facts.

=== Nursing ===
In the study of Transformational Leadership, Creative Self-Efficacy, Trust in Supervisor, Uncertainty Avoidance, and Innovative Work Behavior of Nurses done by Bilal Afsar and Mariam Masood in Mansehra, Pakistan, there were two groups of nurses to see how the relationship among transformational leadership relate to their work behaviors in self-efficacy, trust in superiors, and uncertainty avoidance. The first study hypothesized that there is a correlation between transformational leadership, trust, and uncertainty avoidance that takes a toll on the successfulness or effectiveness of their work behavior. The second study hypothesized that the correlation between transformational leadership, trust, and uncertainty avoidance is due to self-efficacy. With a strong and effective transformational leader, leader that finds a change that needs to be done and makes the change following a specific path with the help of members in the group, providing them with what is necessary to work with; makes their work behavior more successful when nurses have a high level of trust and uncertainty avoidance.

The nurses from Study 1 were from public sector hospitals where they were allowed to test out new ideas without the fear of losing their job. They were allowed to take risks in their job location. Employees with high uncertainty avoidance deal with uncertainty through the use of rules and regulations that are set in place. Transformational leaders assist their employees or people below them to take their risks with the correct research and knowledge prior to taking them. These employees with high UA are more open to their transformational leaders. The nurses from Study 2 were from private sector hospitals where they were allowed to do the same as Study 1. Both studies turned out to have the same conclusion, where there were high levels of trust and uncertainty avoidance, transformational leadership had a higher relationship with innovative behavior. Also, creative self-efficacy did have a correlation among transformational leadership, trust, and uncertainty avoidance. Although, it was discovered that transformational leadership was only useful when there was high levels of trust and high uncertainty avoidance. The leadership wouldn't work if there was a high level of trust and low uncertainty avoidance or the opposite.

== See also ==
- Ambiguity aversion also known as uncertainty aversion
- Cross-cultural communication
- Cross-cultural leadership
- Cross-cultural psychology
- Cultural norms
- Culture shock
- Edward T. Hall
- Emotions and culture
- Fons Trompenaars
- Hofstede's cultural dimensions theory
- Intercultural communication
- National character studies
- National identity
