= National character studies =

20th-century field in anthropological studies

National character studies is a set of anthropological studies conducted during and immediately after World War II. This involves the identification of people, ethnicity, and races according to specific, indomitable cultural characteristics.

== History ==
National character studies arose from a variety of approaches with Culture and Personality, including the configurationalist approach of Edward Sapir and Ruth Benedict, the basic personality structure developed by Ralph Linton and Abram Kardiner, and the modal personality approach of Cora Du Bois. These approaches disagreed with each other on the exact relationship between personality and culture. The configurationalist and basic approaches both treated personalities within a culture as relatively homogeneous, while Cora Du Bois argued that there are no common personality traits found in every single member of a society.

Examples of national character studies in America include those undertaken to differentiate the Japanese character from the Chinese within the initiative of understanding Asians on a more strategic level after the attack on Pearl Harbor in 1941. These were conducted by a group of specialists, including sociologists, anthropologists, and psychologists. By 1953, national character studies included the cultures of France, Spain, Czechoslovakia, Poland, Russia, East European Jews, Syria, and China.

== Major works ==
Major works on national character include:

- Ruth Benedict's The Chrysanthemum and the Sword on Japanese national character. Because researchers could not enter Japan at the time, Benedict conducted her research as "fieldwork-at-a-distance" through literature, film, and Japanese expatriates (mostly internment camp victims) in the United States. Although her work can be criticized for returning to the "armchair anthropology" of the earliest anthropologists (such as Edward Tylor), other scholars of Japan have verified the symbolic importance of aestheticism and militarism for national identity (which is not necessarily to say individual personality).
- Margaret Mead's And Keep Your Powder Dry: An Anthropologist Looks at America (1942)
- Geoffrey Gorer's The People of Great Russia: A Psychological Study (1949)

This last monograph led to the demise of National Character Studies and Culture and Personality as a whole due to its poor reception. In it, Gorer argues that the personality of the Russians, so distasteful to their enemies and his sponsor, the Americans, resulting from their practice of swaddling infants, wrapping them tightly in blankets. This, Gorer posited, generated cold and removed personalities in adulthood. This theory became known as the "swaddling hypothesis", and was generally regarded as unworkable, simplistic, and hastily determined.

The main contribution of Culture and Personality was to show that, revolutionary at the time, socialization continued beyond infancy and early childhood, and national discourses could have an effect on personal character. The entire approach is now considered defunct.

== See also ==
- Collective memory
- Cultural determinism
- Ethnic stereotype
- Margaret Mead
- Nationalism
- Nihonjinron
- Seny
- Sisu
