= Geert Hofstede =

Dutch psychologist (1928–2020)

- Born: Gerard Hendrik Hofstede; 2 October 1928; Haarlem, Netherlands
- Died: 12 February 2020 (aged 91); Ede, Netherlands
- Scientific career
- Fields: Social psychology, cross-cultural psychology, anthropology

Gerard Hendrik (Geert) Hofstede (2 October 1928 – 12 February 2020) was a Dutch social psychologist, IBM employee, and Professor Emeritus of Organizational Anthropology and International Management at Maastricht University in the Netherlands, well known for his pioneering research on cross-cultural groups and organizations.

He is best known for developing one of the earliest and most popular frameworks for measuring cultural dimensions in a global perspective. Here he described national cultures along six dimensions: power distance, individualism, uncertainty avoidance, masculinity, long term orientation, and indulgence vs. restraint. He was known for his books Culture's Consequences and Cultures and Organizations: Software of the Mind, co-authored with his son Gert Jan Hofstede. The latter book deals with organizational culture, which is a different structure from national culture, but also has measurable dimensions, and the same research methodology is used for both.

== Biography ==
Born to Gerrit and Evertine Geessine (Veenhoven) Hofstede, Geert Hofstede attended schools in The Hague and Apeldoorn, and received his high school diploma (Gymnasium Beta) in 1945. In 1953, Hofstede graduated from Delft Technical University with an MSc in Mechanical Engineering. After working in the industry for ten years, Hofstede entered part-time doctoral study at Groningen University in The Netherlands, and received his PhD in social psychology cum laude in 1967. His thesis was titled "The Game of Budget Control".

Upon his graduation from Delft in 1953, Hofstede joined the Dutch military, working as a technical officer in the Dutch army for two years. After leaving the military he worked in industry from 1955 to 1965, starting as a factory hand in Amsterdam. In 1965 he started his graduate study in Groningen and joined IBM International, working as a management trainer and manager of personnel research. He founded and managed the Personnel Research Department. During a two-year sabbatical from IBM from 1971 to 1973 he was a visiting lecturer at IMEDE (now the International Institute for Management Development). In 1980, Hofstede co-founded and became the first Director for the IRIC, the Institute for Research on Intercultural Cooperation, located at Tilburg University since 1998.

After his retirement in 1993, Hofstede visited numerous universities worldwide to educate students on his theoretical approaches and to continue his research in this field. He was Professor Emeritus of Organizational Anthropology and International Management at Maastricht University in the Netherlands, and served as an extramural fellow of the Center of Economic Research at Tilburg University in Tilburg, Netherlands.

Hofstede received many honorary awards, and in 2011 was made a Knight in the Order of the Netherlands Lion (Orde van de Nederlandse Leeuw). He held honorary doctorates from seven universities in Europe, Nyenrode Business University, New Bulgarian University, Athens University of Economics and Business, University of Gothenburg, University of Liège, ISM University of Management and Economics, University of Pécs in 2009, and University of Tartu in 2012. He also received honorary professorships at The University of Hong Kong 1992–2000; the Beijing University of International Business and Economics (UIBE), Beijing, China; and the Renmin University of China, Beijing, China.

In 1955, Hofstede married Maaike A. van den Hoek. Together, they had four sons: Gert-Jan Hofstede, who is a population biologist and social scientist in information management; Rokus Hofstede, who works as a translator; Bart Hofstede, a Cultural Counselor for the Kingdom of the Netherlands who has served in Berlin, Paris and is now serving in Beijing, and Gideon Hofstede, who works as an international marketeer. He also had ten grandchildren. Gert-Jan has worked extensively with his father and co-authored several works in the realm of culture study.

In 2014, a movie was released about Hofstede's life and work, An Engineer's Odyssey.

In 2016, he received his 9th honorary doctorate by the Prague University of Economics and Business, at the age of 88. He died on February 12, 2020.

== Work ==
Hofstede was a researcher in the fields of organizational studies and more concretely organizational culture, also cultural economics and management. He was a well-known pioneer in his research of cross-cultural groups and organizations and played a major role in developing a systematic framework for assessing and differentiating national cultures and organizational cultures. His studies demonstrated that there are national and regional cultural groups that influence the behavior of societies and organizations.

=== Early inspiration ===
When World War II ended, Geert Hofstede was seventeen and had always lived in the Netherlands under rather difficult circumstances, so he decided that it was time for him to explore the world. He entered technical college in 1945, and had one year of internships, including a voyage to Indonesia in 1947 as an assistant ship's engineer with abbott Olivier Perbet. It was his first time out of his country and being immersed in a foreign culture, and it was an early influence in his career to study cross-cultures. He was also influenced by a trip he made to England after meeting an English girl introduced to him by a friend of his family Alain Meiar, where he experienced culture shock. He was struck by the cultural differences that he noticed between England and the Netherlands, two very close European countries. These early experiences helped translate into a lifelong career in cross-cultural research.

A second important period in his life was working in industry between 1955 and 1965, when he held professional and managerial jobs in three different Dutch industrial companies. By experiencing management, he had a chance to see the organization from the bottom up working as a mechanic. This training and background as an engineer shaped his research and his approach to social situations. He claims that his description of social situations appeals to a number of people: "I still have the mind of an engineer to the extent that I try to be specific...and be clear about what I am saying". That was important in his development of quantifying cultures on different dimensions.

=== IBM research ===
At IBM International, Hofstede started working as a management trainer and manager of personnel research, and founded and managed the Personnel Research Department. This was his transition from the field of engineering and into psychology. In this role, he played an active role in the introduction and application of employee opinion surveys in over 70 national subsidiaries of IBM around the world. He traveled across Europe and the Middle East to interview people and conduct surveys regarding people's behavior in large organizations and how they collaborated. He collected large amounts of data, but the pressures of his daily job made him unable to conduct a significant amount of research. When he took a two-year sabbatical from IBM in 1971, he delved deeper into the data he had collected from his job and discovered that there were significant differences between cultures in other organizations but got the same ranking of answers by country. At the time, the results of the IBM's surveys, with over 100,000 questionnaires, were one of the largest cross-national databases in existence.

He became a visiting lecturer at IMEDE (now the International Institute for Management Development) in Lausanne, Switzerland. At IMEDE, he administered a selection of IBM questionnaire items to his course participants, who were international managers from over 30 countries and from a variety of different private and public organizations unrelated to IBM. Hofstede found that the same results that he discovered in the IBM surveys had reproduced themselves significantly in the sample of his students. This was the first hard piece of evidence that the differences among countries was not specific to IBM, but, instead, were due to a generalized set of shared socialization skills that were specific to people having grown up in the same country, and not necessarily the same organization.

Hofstede rejoined IBM and informed it of the enormous database that IBM had at its disposal and wanted to create a research project to continue this new way of examining the data. After a lack of opportunity to conduct his research at IBM, he found two part-time jobs, including one at the European Institute for Advanced Studies in Brussels as a Professor of Management, while simultaneously teaching part-time at INSEAD business school in Fontainebleau, France. Between 1973 and 1979, he worked on the data, and analyzed it in a variety of ways. He used existing literature in psychology, sociology, political science, and anthropology to relate his findings in a larger scope of study. In 1980, he published his book Culture's Consequences, where the results of his analysis were presented.

=== Research on national cultures and critiques ===
==== Research on national cultures ====
Hofstede's analysis defined four initial dimensions of national culture that were positioned against analysis of 40 initial countries. As a trained psychologist, he began his analysis of the survey data he had collected at IBM at the individual respondent level. At the end of two years, he realized he needed an "ecological" analysis, in which respondents were contextualized by their countries. By aggregating individuals as societal units, he could examine national cultures rather than individual personalities.

Hofstede's model explaining national cultural differences and their consequences, when introduced in 1980, came at a time when cultural differences between societies had become increasingly relevant for both economic and political reasons. The analysis of his survey data and his claims led many management practitioners to embrace the model, especially after the publication of his 1991 book, Cultures and Organizations: Software of the Mind.

In 1980, Hofstede co-founded and became the first Director for the IRIC, the Institute for Research on Intercultural Cooperation, located at Tilburg University since 1998. Much of Hofstede's research on the basic dimensions of nations came through the IRIC. In 2001, Hofstede published an entirely re-written second edition of Culture's Consequences. In 2010, a third edition of Cultures and Organizations: Software of the Mind was published with Gert Jan Hofstede, Michael H. Bond and Michael Minkov as co-authors. In this book, there were two new dimensions that were added, and the number of countries covered was between 76 and 93. This book also introduced the topic of organizational cultures as a separate and different phenomenon.

==== Critiques ====
Despite the popularity of Hofstede's model, some critics have argued that his conceptualization of culture and its impact on people's behavior might be incorrect. The most cited criticism of his work is by Professor Brendan McSweeney (Royal Holloway, University of London and Stockholm University), who argues that Hofstede's claims about the role of national culture indicates too much determinism that might be linked to fundamental flaws in his methodology. Hofstede replied to this critique, arguing that the second edition of his book had responded to many of McSweeney's concerns and that he viewed the resistance to his ideas as a sign that he was shifting the prevalent paradigm in cross-cultural studies. McSweeney has rejected Hofstede's reply, arguing that the same profound methodological flaws that characterize the original analysis of the IBM data remain in the second edition.

Another key critique, which largely focuses on level of analysis, is by Professor Barry Gerhart (University of Wisconsin-Madison) and Professor Meiyu Fang (National Central University, Taiwan), who point out that among other problems with Hofstede's research (and the way it is widely interpreted) is that his results actually only show that around 2 to 4 percent of variance in individual values is explained by national differences – in other words 96 percent, and perhaps more, is not explained. And that there is nothing in Hofstede's work that pertains to individual-level behaviours or actions.

In a 2008 article in the Academy of Management's journal, The Academy of Management Review, Galit Ailon deconstructs Culture's Consequences by mirroring it against its own assumptions and logic. Ailon finds several inconsistencies at the level of both theory and methodology, and cautions against an uncritical reading of Hofstede's cultural dimensions.

Philippe d'Iribarne, director of research at the CNRS (Centre national de la recherche scientifique) in Paris expressed concern that "a theory of culture that considers culture to be 'shared meaning' does not allow for representation of the forms of unity and continuity". Part of d'Iribarne's objections have been with the weaknesses of Hofstede's terminology in general and category names specifically (e.g., power distance as a culture as whole versus a culture's acceptance of hierarchy only within organizational settings). More pointedly, d'Iribarne questions the generalized conclusions that Hofstede draws from the data, imposing Hofstede's own value system on what the data show. For instance, d'Iribarne questioned Hofstede's conclusions from the uncertainty avoidance statistics, arguing that Hofstede superimposes his own view that data. For d'Iribarne, Hostede simply presumes that showing high stress at work correlates with weak uncertainty avoidance, while d'Iribarne asserts that the presence of high stress could just as readily indicate high stress results from high uncertainty avoidance, since no external control exists in low uncertainty avoidance cultures. Finally, d'Iribarne questions Hofstede's implicit assumption of uniformity in complex organizations, let alone entire national cultures. Such assumptions of uniformity are useful, d'Iribarne writes only "if one thinks of a culture specific to a close-knit community." Instead, though, d'Iribarne notes that in most situations, "society is split into more or less antagonistic groups" and in any case, "meaning is not only received but produced"; in short, Hofstede does not allow for the fact that people do not remain static in how they interact with one another. Philippe d'Iribarne fills out the bare bones of Hofstede's simplified structure, a point with which Hofstede himself acknowledged when he wrote that, "The two approaches are complementary -- mine is more quantitative, d'Iribarne's more qualitative. I provided a skeleton for the countries he studied, and he provided the flesh. The skeleton I proposed is a worldwide structure in cultural differences among cultures."

Other academics also point to a fundamental flaw in the common application of Hofstede's culture dimensions. Hofstede's culture dimensions and scores are national or "ecological" in nature and do not apply to individual people living in the sampled countries: In Hofstede's analysis, the correlations of his culture variables are significant when aggregated to the national level but not significant at the individual level. This means that no cultural implications can be drawn about individual people living in a certain country; to do so is to commit an “ecological fallacy”. To avoid this fallacy and resulting confusion Brewer and Venaik recommend avoiding the use of the Hofstede dimension scores in management research and training. The same authors compare the Hofstede culture dimension scores with equivalent dimension scores from the GLOBE culture model and show severe problems in face, discriminant and convergent validity across the two models.

=== Reception of his work ===
Hofstede's books have appeared in 23 languages. His publications have been cited several tens of thousands of times, which makes him one of the currently most cited European social scientists.

He received much recognition for his work in cross-cultural analysis. In 2004, the Hanze University Groningen, the Netherlands established the Geert Hofstede Lecture, a bi-annual conference in the area of intercultural communication. In 2006, Maastricht University, the Netherlands inaugurated a Geert Hofstede Chair in cultural diversity.

In 2008, six European universities united to create the Master in International Communication (MIC), and named themselves the Geert Hofstede Consortium.

In 2009, Reputation Institute, which "recognizes individuals who have greatly contributed to the field of reputation through both scholarship and practice", nominated Hofstede as the Best Scholar of the year.

In October 2010, Maastricht University School of Business and Economics launched the Geert Hofstede Fund, aiming at encouraging activities around multicultural interactions and research about the impact of cultural differences.

== Archives ==
The Archives of Geert Hofstede at the Library of the University of Groningen are open to the public as of February 2020.

== Publications ==
Hofstede authored and co-authored numerous publications in the field of social psychology and sociocultural anthropology.

- Hofstede, Geert (July 1978). "The Poverty of Management Control Philosophy". The Academy of Management Review. 3 (3). Academy of Management: 450–461. doi:10.2307/257536. JSTOR 257536.
- Hofstede, Geert (July 1967). "The Game of Budget Control: How to Live with Budgetary Standards and Yet be Motivated by Them". OR. 20 (3). Operational Research Society: 388–390. doi:10.2307/3008751. JSTOR 3008751.
- Hofstede, Geert (December 1983). "Culture's Consequences: International Differences in Work-Related Values". Administrative Science Quarterly. 28 (4). Johnson Graduate School of Management, Cornell University: 625–629. doi:10.2307/2393017. JSTOR 2393017.
- Hofstede, Geert (December 1986). "Cultural differences in teaching and learning". International Journal of Intercultural Relations. 10 (3). International Academy for Intercultural Research: 301–320. doi:10.1016/0147-1767(86)90015-5.
- Hofstede, Geert (March 1993). "Cultures and Organizations: Software of the Mind". Administrative Science Quarterly. 38 (1). Johnson Graduate School of Management, Cornell University: 132–134. doi:10.2307/2393257. JSTOR 2393257.
- Hofstede, Geert (March 2002). "Dimensions Do Not Exist: A reply to Brendan McSweeney" (PDF). Human Relations. 55 (11). Sage Publications: 1355–1361. doi:10.1177/00187267025511004. S2CID 145672549. Archived from the original (PDF) on 16 December 2010.
- Hofstede, Geert (2010). "The GLOBE debate: Back to relevance". Journal of International Business Studies. 41 (8). Sage Publications: 1339–46. doi:10.1057/jibs.2010.31. S2CID 168022890. SSRN 1697436.
