= List of University of California, Irvine people =

This article lists noted individuals associated with the University of California, Irvine.

== Notable alumni ==
The following are noted alumni and students of the University of California, Irvine, listed by the field(s) they have been noted for. When the information is known and available, degree and year are listed in parentheses.

=== Academia and education ===
- Noeline Alcorn – education researcher
- Paul Chien (PhD 1971) – biologist on the faculty of the University of San Francisco
- Richard James Cote (B.S. 1976) – professor of pathology in the Department of Pathology and Immunology at Washington University School of Medicine
- Channing Der (PhD 1981, microbiology) – Sarah Graham Kenan Distinguished Professor of Pharmacology, at UNC Lineberger Comprehensive Cancer Center
- Sara Diamond (B.A. 1980) – sociologist
- Charles M. Falco (PhD 1974) – experimental physicist, professor emeritus at the University of Arizona
- Efi Foufoula-Georgiou – Distinguished Professor in the civil and environmental engineering at the University of California, Irvine
- Erin Gruwell (B.A. 1991) – high school teacher whose real-life story inspired the movie Freedom Writers
- Kevin Nadal (BA, 2000) – professor of Psychology, author, media correspondent
- Cecilia Richards (PhD 1990) – mechanical engineer, professor emerita at Washington State University
- David Schlaepfer (PhD 1992) – professor in the Department of Reproductive Medicine in the School of Medicine at the University of California, San Diego
- Deana L. Weibel (BA, 1991) – cultural anthropologist and professor at Grand Valley State University
- Jim Whitehead (PhD 2000) – originator of WebDAV, UCSC professor

=== Art ===
- Michael Asher (B.F.A. 1966) – conceptual artist
- Dan Bayles (M.F.A. 2007) – abstract artist
- Chris Burden (M.F.A. 1971) – performance artist
- Erica Cho (M.F.A) – artist
- Garnet Hertz (M.F.A, PhD.) – artist, designer, academic
- Tom Jancar (B.A. 1974 and M.F.A. 1976) – contemporary art dealer Jancar Kuhlenschmidt Gallery and Jancar Gallery
- Bart Kosko (PhD 1987) – professor of electrical engineering and law at the University of Southern California
- Lawrence L. Larmore (PhD 1986) – online algorithms researcher, faculty member at UC Riverside and UNLV
- Michael Ramirez (B.S. 1984) – 1994 Pulitzer Prize for Editorial Cartooning in the Memphis Commercial Appeal; senior editor for Investor's Business Daily
- Barbara T. Smith (M.F.A. 1971) – performance artist
- James Turrell – attended, minimalist artist known for his use of light and space installations
- Liat Yossifor (M.F.A. 2002) – painter

=== Business ===
- Arnnon Geshuri – corporate human relations executive
- Wright Massey (M.B.A. 1992) – CEO of Brand Architecture, Inc.
- Betsy McLaughlin (B.A.) – CEO of Hot Topic, Inc.
- Vince Steckler (B.A.) – CEO of Avast Software

=== Entertainment ===
==== Film and television ====
- Colet Abedi (B.A. English literature) – writer and television producer
- Aras Baskauskas (B.A. 2002, philosophy, MBA 2004) – winner on TV reality show Survivor; CEO of TundraWear.com
- Jim Berney (B.S. 1989, computer science) – Academy award-nominated technical director, The Lord of the Rings, The Matrix
- Nazanin Boniadi (B.S. 2003, biological sciences) – actress, official spokeswoman for Amnesty International
- Crista Flanagan (M.F.A. 2001) – actress, Mad Men
- Steve Franks (B.A. 1991) – writer and television producer
- Leslie Fu (B.S. 2014, biological sciences) – YouTube streamer
- Bob Gunton (B.A. 1968) – actor, The Shawshank Redemption, 24, Desperate Housewives; Tony-nominated for Broadway roles in Evita and Sweeney Todd
- Tyler Hoechlin (student athlete – baseball) – actor, star of Teen Wolf and Superman & Lois
- Xanthe Huynh (attended) – voice actress
- Carrie Ann Inaba (attended) – actress/dancer, judge on ABC's Dancing with the Stars
- Chris Kelly (B.A. 2005) – comedy writer (Saturday Night Live) and filmmaker (Other People); co-creator of The Other Two
- Kelly Lin (attended, Economics and English & Comparative Literature) – Taiwanese actress, nominated for best actress for role in Mad Detective at 2007 Venice Film Festival
- Jon Lovitz (B.A. 1979, Theater) – actor and comedian, Saturday Night Live
- Andrea Lowell (attended, Biology) – model, Playboy, VH1's The Surreal Life #6
- Beth Malone (B.A. 2000, Theater) – Tony Award nominee for Best Actress in a musical
- Tom Martin (B.A. 1987, Economics & Political Science) – television writer whose credits include The Simpsons and Saturday Night Live
- Joseph McGinty Nichol a.k.a. McG (B.S. 1990, Psychology) – film director (Charlie's Angels, Terminator Salvation), co-creator of TV series The O.C.
- Joseph Andrew Mclean (English Literature, Politics, Screenwriting) – filmmaker, studied at UCI as an exchange student from the University of Glasgow
- Jeff Meek (B.A. 1983, Drama) – television actor, Raven, As the World Turns and Mortal Kombat: Conquest
- Windell Middlebrooks (M.F.A. 2004, Drama) – actor, star of Body of Proof
- Sepideh Moafi (M.F.A., 2013) – actress, The Pitt
- Grant Nieporte (B.A. 1995, Social Sciences) – film writer, credits include 2008 Will Smith film Seven Pounds
- Sophie Oda (B.F.A. 2012, Musical Theater) – guest actress on The Suite Life of Zack & Cody
- Jade Payton (M.F.A., Acting) – actress on Dynasty and Glamorous
- Kelly Perine (M.F.A. Acting, 1994) – television actor (Between Brothers, The Parent 'Hood, One on One)
- Aurora Snow (attended, Theater Arts, Business) – pornographic actress
- Brian Thompson (M.F.A. Acting, 1984) – actor
- Phil Tippett (B.A., Fine Arts) – filmmaker, Star Wars, RoboCop and Jurassic Park
- Thuy Trang (attended, Civil Engineering) – actress, Trini from Power Rangers
- Byron Velvick (B.A. 1987, English) – star of The Bachelor, Season 6
- Jonathan Eusebio (B.A. 1995, biological sciences) – film director, actor, stunt coordinator, Love Hurts

==== Music ====
- Kei Akagi – toured as pianist for jazz musician and composer Miles Davis
- Joey Burns – frontman of Calexico
- Clara Chung (B.A. 2009, Psychology) – guitarist and singer
- Gregory Coleman (M.A. 2005, Fine Arts) – classical guitarist, recording artist, composer, arranger, educator
- Members of Farside – hardcore punk band
- Kaba Modern – Asian-American dance group established in 1992; six alumni dancers appeared on America's Best Dance Crew
- Till Kahrs (B.A. 1979, Social Science) – recording artist, singer-songwriter, communication skills expert
- Coco Lee (attended) – Chinese pop star
- Kevin Kwan Loucks (B.M. 2004, Piano Performance) – international concert pianist; president and co-founder of Chamber Music OC; member of classical music ensemble Trio Céleste
- Members of Milo Greene – indie/pop band
- Jeffrey Mumford (B.A. 1977) – classical music composer
- Aubrey O'Day (B.A. 2005, Political Science) – member of Danity Kane (Making the Band 3 contestant)
- Members of SLANDER – trap DJ duo
- Savitree Suttichanond (B.A. 2007, International Studies) – Thai singer and actress, Academy Fantasia Season 5
- Members of Thrice – hardcore/rock band
- Joseph Vincent – YouTube singer/songwriter
- Teal Wicks (B.A. 2005, Drama) – singer and stage actress, best known for playing the role of Elphaba in the Broadway production of the musical Wicked
- Vanness Wu – Taiwanese singer, actor, director, producer, member of F4

=== Law ===
- Khaldoun Baghdadi (B.A.) – attorney
- David J.R. Frakt (B.A. 1990, History) – lawyer, law professor, noted for his appointment to defend Guantanamo detainee Mohammed Jawad

=== Literature ===
- Nevada Barr (M.F.A. 1978) – author of Anna Pigeon mysteries
- Michael A. Bellesiles (PhD 1986) – controversial historian and author of Arming America, The Origins of a National Gun Culture
- Aimee Bender (M.F.A. 1998) – author of The Girl in the Flammable Skirt
- David Benioff (M.F.A. 1999) – author of The 25th Hour, husband of actress Amanda Peet, co-creator of HBO's hit television series Game of Thrones
- Chelsea Cain (B.A. 1994, Political Science) – fiction writer
- Michael Chabon (M.F.A. 1987) – 2001 Pulitzer Prize-winning author for his novel The Amazing Adventures of Kavalier & Clay
- Leonard Chang (M.F.A) – Korean-American writer of short stories and novels
- Joshua Ferris (M.F.A.) – author of Then We Came to the End which was nominated for the National Book Award and won the PEN/Hemingway Award
- Brian Flemming (B.A. 1998, English) – director and playwright
- Richard Ford (M.F.A. 1970) – Pulitzer Prize-winning author in Fiction for Independence Day
- Glen David Gold (M.F.A . 1998) – author of Carter Beats the Devil and Sunnyside
- Yusef Komunyakaa (M.F.A. 1980) – Pulitzer Prize-winning poet for Neon Vernacular
- T. Jefferson Parker (M.F.A. 1976) – fiction writer; author of Laguna Heat, Little Saigon, and Pacific Heat
- Alice Sebold (M.F.A. 1998) – bestselling novelist, author of The Lovely Bones
- Danzy Senna (M.F.A. 1996) – writer
- Maria Helena Viramontes (M.F.A. 1994) – Chicana fiction writer
- Peter Wild (M.F.A. 1969) – poet, historian, and professor of English at the University of Arizona

=== Military ===
- Fred Chasan (M.D. 1962) – U.S. Army WWII medic, U.S. Navy medical officer, owner of the Chasan Villa
- John P. Condon (Ph.D. 1976) – U.S. Marine Corps major general and aviator
- Leon J. LaPorte (M.B.A. 1977) – retired United States Army general who served as commander, United States Forces Korea until 2006
- Laura Yeager – U.S. Army general; first woman to command an Army infantry division

=== Politics ===
- Ami Bera (B.S. 1987, Biological Sciences and M.D. 1991) – United States Congressman representing California's 7th Congressional District
- Tim Donnelly (B.A. 1989) – California State Assemblyman representing the 59th assembly district
- Jeremy Harris (M.S. Environmental Biology) – former mayor of Honolulu
- Mark Keam (B.A. 1988, Political Science) – member of the Virginia House of Delegates representing the 35th district
- Bill Leonard (B.A. 1969, History) – former California state senator
- Linda Newell (B.A.) – Colorado state senator representing the 26th District
- Janet Nguyen (B.A. 1998, Political Science) – member of the Orange County Board of Supervisors, first Vietnamese-American to hold county office in the United States
- Geoffrey R. Pyatt (B.A. 1985) – U.S. Ambassador to Greece
- Michael A. Rice (PhD 1987, Comparative Psychology) – Rhode Island state representative representing the 35th District
- Jose Solorio (B.S. 1992, Social Ecology) – California State Assemblyman, prior Councilmember of Ward 1 – City of Santa Ana
- Audra Strickland (B.A. 1996, Political Science) – California State Assemblywoman representing the 37th assembly district
- Van Tran (B.A. 1990, Political Science) – California State Assemblyman, first Vietnamese-American state legislator in the United States

=== Science and technology ===
- Deanna M. Church (PhD 1997) – bioinformatics and genomics researcher with the National Center for Biotechnology Information
- Roy Fielding (PhD 2000) – Internet pioneer, creator of HTTP 1.1, co-founder of Apache Foundation
- James D. McCaffrey (B.A. 1975) – software engineer and author; see combinatorial number system and factorial number system
- Paul Mockapetris (PhD 1982, Computer Science) – Internet pioneer, co-inventor of the Domain Name System
- Kathie L. Olsen (PhD 1979, Neuroscience) – chief operating officer of the National Science Foundation; NASA's Chief Scientist
- Andrew P. Ordon (B.S. 1972) – plastic surgeon, host of The Doctors

=== Sports ===
==== Baseball ====
- Brady Anderson (attended, Economics) – former Major League Baseball (MLB) outfielder for the Boston Red Sox and the Baltimore Orioles, three-time American League all-star
- Dylan Axelrod (B.A. 2007, Social Ecology) – former MLB pitcher for the Chicago White Sox and Cincinnati Reds
- Christian Bergman – former MLB pitcher for the Colorado Rockies and Seattle Mariners
- Nathan Church – MLB outfielder for the St. Louis Cardinals
- Calvin Faucher – MLB pitcher for the Tampa Bay Rays and Miami Marlins
- Keston Hiura – MLB infielder for the Milwaukee Brewers, Los Angeles Angels, and Colorado Rockies
- Christian Koss – MLB infielder for the San Francisco Giants
- Doug Linton – former MLB, Korea Baseball Organization (KBO), and Chinese Professional Baseball League (CPBL) pitcher
- Ben Orloff – former minor league baseball player and current UCI head coach
- Andre Pallante – MLB pitcher for the St. Louis Cardinals
- Bryan Petersen – former MLB outfielder for the Florida Marlins
- Taylor Rashi – MLB pitcher for the Arizona Diamondbacks
- Sean Tracey – former MLB pitcher for the Baltimore Orioles and Chicago White Sox
- Gary Wheelock – former MLB pitcher for the California Angels and Seattle Mariners

==== Basketball ====
- Scott Brooks (B.A. 1987) – NBA coach and former player; former head coach of the Oklahoma City Thunder and Washington Wizards, point guard on the 1994 NBA Champion Houston Rockets
- Steve Cleveland (B.A. 1976) – former men's head basketball coach at Brigham Young University and Fresno State University
- Joe Lacob (B.S. Biological Sciences) – owner of NBA's Golden State Warriors
- Kevin Magee (1959–2003) – basketball player
- Tod Murphy (B.A. 1986) – former NBA player and third-round pick of the Seattle SuperSonics in the 1986 NBA draft; former assistant coach for the UCI men's basketball team
- Angie Ned (B.A. 2007) – college basketball coach
- Olivier Rioux (class of 2028) – current Anteaters basketball player; tallest individual ever to play college basketball
- Tom Tolbert (transferred) – former NBA player and former color-commentator for ABC Sports

==== Football ====
- David Baker (B.A. 1975) – commissioner of the Arena Football League (1987–2008), former President of the Pro Football Hall of Fame (2014 - 2021)
- Carl Cheffers – National Football League official; head referee for Super Bowl LI and Super Bowl LV
- Darren Fells (B.A. Sociology) – tight end for the Houston Texans; played basketball at UCI and professionally in Europe and Latin America

==== Olympians ====
- Peter Campbell (B.A. 1982) – won two silver medals (1984 and 1988) Olympics (water polo)
- Jennifer Chandler – gold medalist in the 1976 Olympics (diving)
- Gary Figueroa (B.A. 1980) – silver medalist in the 1984 Olympics (water polo)
- Brad Alan Lewis (B.A. 1976) – gold medalist in the 1984 Olympics (rowing), author of Assault on Lake Casitas
- Greg Louganis (B.A. 1983) – four-time Olympic gold medalist (diving)
- Lovre Miloš (B.A. 2016) – Croatian Olympic water polo team (2020)
- Amber Neben (M.S. Biology) – U.S. National Road Race Champion, 2005 & 2006 Tour de l'Aude winner, 2008 World TT Champion, and placed 33rd in the road race at the 2008 Olympics
- Mike Powell – world long jump record-holder; two-time Olympic silver medalist (track and field)
- Steve Scott (B.A. 1978) – American record holder for the indoor mile (3:58.7); world record holder for the most sub-four-minute miles (136)

==== Soccer ====
- Carlos Aguilar – forward for the Rochester Rhinos of USL Professional Division
- Cameron Dunn – defender for the Los Angeles Blues of the USL Professional Division
- Brad Evans – midfielder for Seattle Sounders FC of Major League Soccer and the United States men's national soccer team
- Irving Garcia – forward for the New York Red Bulls of Major League Soccer
- Anthony Hamilton (B.A. 2010, Literary Journalism) – forward for the Rochester Rhinos of the USL Professional Division
- Miguel Ibarra – midfielder for Minnesota United FC of Major League Soccer
- Cameron Iwasa – forward for Sporting Kansas City of Major League Soccer
- Cami Privett (Sociology) – former NWSL soccer player for the Houston Dash
- Kenny Schoeni (B.A. 2006) – former goalkeeper for the Columbus Crew of Major League Soccer

==== Other sports ====
- Shane del Rosario (B.A. Psychology) – professional mixed martial artist
- Jillian Kraus (born 1986; MBA) – water polo player
- Richard Lubner (born 1967) – Tennis player

== Faculty ==
- Vartkess Ara Apkarian – Distinguished Professor of Chemistry and director of Center for Chemistry at the Space-Time Limit
- Francisco J. Ayala – 2001 National Medal of Science, 2010 Templeton Prize, founding director of the Bren Fellows Program, professor of Ecology and Evolutionary Biology, and of Philosophy
- Ricardo Asch – fertility doctor and fugitive, accused of stealing ova from women while a UC Irvine employee
- Pierre Baldi – Chancellor's Professor of Computer Science and director of the Institute for Genomics and Bioinformatics
- Lindon W. Barrett – director of African Studies, professor and cultural theorist
- Gregory Benford – physicist, science fiction author of the Galactic Center Saga
- George W. Brown – Information scientist and dean of the business school
- Jan Brueckner – Distinguished Professor of Economics
- Ron Carlson – professor of English, MFA Programs in Writing
- Cameron Carter – distinguished professor of psychiatry
- Leo Chavez – anthropologist and author
- Erwin Chemerinsky – founding dean of the UCI School of Law, lawyer, law professor, and United States constitutional law and civil procedure scholar
- Robert Cohen – acting teacher and author
- Rui de Figueiredo – research professor of Electrical Engineering and Computer Science, and Mathematics
- Jacques Derrida (1986–2004 [his death]) – philosopher
- Paul Dourish – Professor of Informatics
- Michael Dennin – professor of physics and astronomy
- Nikil Dutt – Chancellor's Professor of Computer Science
- David Eppstein – professor of Computer Science
- Martha S. Feldman – professor of Urban Planning and Public Policy, Johnson Chair for Civic Governance and Public Management
- Zachary Fisk – professor of physics and astronomy
- Walter M. Fitch – professor of Molecular Evolution
- Victor Fleischer – professor of Law
- Matthew Foreman – professor of Mathematics
- Michael Franz – Chancellor's Professor of Computer Science
- Robert Garfias – musicologist, awarded the Order of the Rising Sun
- Jean-Luc Gaudiot – professor at the Henry Samueli School of Engineering
- Amy Gerstler – poet, professor of English, winner of National Book Critics Circle Award
- Michael T. Goodrich – Chancellor's Professor of Computer Science
- Louis A. Gottschalk – neuroscientist, professor emeritus
- Nancy Guerra – psychologist and dean of the School of Social Ecology
- Jutta Heckhausen – professor of Psychological Science
- William Heidbrink – professor of physics and astronomy
- James D. Herbert – professor and chair of the Art History department
- Payam Heydari – Chancellor's Professor of Electrical Engineering and Computer Science
- Dan Hirschberg – professor of Computer Science
- Donald Hoffman – professor of Cognitive Science
- Hamid Jafarkhani – professor of Electrical Engineering and Computer Science
- Ramesh Jain – Bren Professor of Computer Science
- Valerie Jenness – professor of Criminology, Law & Society, Sociology, and Nursing Science
- David Kirkby – professor of physics and astronomy
- Murray Krieger – literary critic and theorist
- Michelle Latiolais – professor of English, MFA Programs in Writing
- Elizabeth Loftus – psychologist, Distinguished Professor in the School of Social Ecology
- R. Duncan Luce – cognitive psychologist, 2003 National Medal of Science, Distinguished Research Professor of Cognitive Science
- Penelope Maddy – Distinguished Professor of Logic and Philosophy of Science and Mathematics, famous for her work in philosophy of mathematics
- David B. Malament – Distinguished Professor of Logic and Philosophy of Science, best known for his work in the philosophy of physics
- George Marcus – Chancellor's Professor of Anthropology
- Athina Markopoulou – Chancellor's Professor of Engineering
- James McGaugh – research professor of Neurobiology and Behavior, founding director of the Center for the Neurobiology of Learning and Memory
- Donald McKayle – choreographer
- J. Hillis Miller – literary critic
- Douglas L. Mills – professor of physics
- Bonnie Nardi – professor of Informatics
- Peter Navarro – professor of business, incumbent director of the White House National Trade Council
- David Neumark – Professor of Economics, expert on labor economics
- Ngũgĩ wa Thiong'o – author of A Grain of Wheat, Distinguished Professor in the School of Humanities and director of the International Center for Writing and Translation
- James Nowick – professor of Chemistry
- William H. Parker – professor of Physics
- Richard E. Pattis – author of the Karel programming language
- Elizabeth D. Peña – professor and Associate Dean of Faculty Development & Diversity
- Lyman W. Porter – dean of UC Irvine's Paul Merage School of Business from 1972 to 1983
- Curt Pringle – mayor of Anaheim, former speaker of the California State Assembly
- R. Radhakrishnan – Chancellor's Professor of English and Comparative Literature
- Nasrin Rahimieh – Howard Baskerville Professor of Humanities in the Department of Comparative Literature; director of the Humanities Core program
- Frederick Reines (deceased) – Nobel laureate, Physics 1995; faculty from 1966 to 1998
- Eric Rignot – professor of Earth System Science
- Irwin Rose – Nobel laureate (Chemistry 2004)
- F. Sherwood Rowland – Nobel laureate (Chemistry 1995), research professor in Chemistry and Earth System Science
- Donald G. Saari – Distinguished Professor of Mathematics and Economics
- Dr. William Sears – Associate Clinical Professor of Pediatrics, author of the Sears Parenting Library
- Patricia Seed – professor of History
- Barry Siegel – Pulitzer Prize winner
- Brian Skyrms – philosophy of science expert, Distinguished Professor of social science
- David A. Snow – Distinguished Professor of Sociology
- Etel L. Solingen – Tierney Chair, professor of Political Science, former President of the International Studies Association, 2012–2013, author of award-winning Nuclear Logics
- George Sperling – cognitive psychologist, Distinguished Professor of Cognitive Science
- Grover C. Stephens (faculty 1964–2003, deceased) – professor and dean of Biological Sciences
- Lee Swindlehurst – professor of Electrical Engineering and Computer Science
- Rein Taagepera (until 1991) – Estonian politician and political scientist
- Timothy M. P. Tait – Chancellor's Professor of Physics and Astronomy
- Edward O. Thorp – author (Beat the Dealer: A Winning Strategy for the Game of Twenty-One), professor of mathematics
- Deborah Vandell – founding dean of the School of Education, expert on child care and after-school programs
- Frederic Wan – professor emeritus of Applied Mathematics
- Martin Wattenberg – political scientist
- Douglas R. White – social anthropologist and network sociologist, author of Network Analysis and Ethnographic Problems
- Daniel Whiteson – American experimental particle physicist and professor of Physics and Astronomy
- Kumar Wickramasinghe – Henry Samueli Endowed Chair and inventor of Kelvin Probe Force Microscopy and other microscopy techniques
- Jon Wiener – historian
- Geoffrey Wolff – co-director of a writing program
- Jenny Y Yang – chemist

== Chancellors ==
The follow persons served as chancellor of University of California, Irvine from 1962 to the present.

No.	Portrait	Chancellor	Term start	Term end	Refs.
1		Daniel G. Aldrich	January 20, 1962	August 31, 1984	
2		Jack W. Peltason	September 1, 1984	September 30, 1992	
acting		L. Dennis Smith	October 1, 1992	June 30, 1993	
3		Laurel L. Wilkening	July 1, 1993	June 30, 1998	
4		Ralph J. Cicerone	July 1, 1998	June 30, 2005	
5		Michael V. Drake	July 1, 2005	June 30, 2014	
interim		Howard Gillman	July 1, 2014	September 18, 2014	
6		Howard Gillman	September 18, 2014	present	
