= Douglas R. White =

American social scientist (1942–2021)

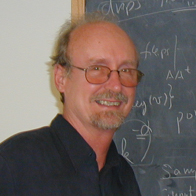
- Douglas R. White
- Born: 1942
- Died: August 22, 2021
- Education: University of Michigan
- Occupation: Anthropologist
- Known for: Network Analysis and Ethnographic Problems, Complexity research, Standard cross-cultural sample

Douglas R. White (1942 – 22 August 2021) was an American complexity researcher, social anthropologist, sociologist, and social network researcher at the University of California, Irvine.

== Biography ==
Douglas White was born in Minneapolis in 1942. He attended the University of Michigan, Columbia University, and the University of Minnesota, where he received a B.A. in 1964, an M.A. in 1967, and a Ph.D. degree in 1969, all under advisor E. Adamson Hoebel and the Travelling Scholars Program.

White taught at the University of Pittsburgh from 1967 to 1976. Since then he has been a Social Science Professor at the University of California, Irvine, teaching in Social Relations, in Comparative Culture, in Social Networks and in Anthropology. He co-founded and chaired the Social Networks PhD program and within the Institute for Mathematical Behavioral Sciences chaired the Social Dynamics and Complexity research group and the UC four-campus videoconference group.

He was on the external faculty at the Santa Fe Institute, was on the governing Council of the European Complex Systems Society, and served as President of the Social Science Computing Association and of the Linkages Development Research Council.

He founded the World Cultures electronic journal in 1985 as part of the movement for open access scientific data and publication and founded the open access and peer reviewed Structure and Dynamics electronic journal in 2005, where he continued as editor-in-chief.

He was a recipient of the U.S. Distinguished Scientist Award of the Alexander von Humboldt Foundation, the "Best Paper in Mathematical Sociology of 2004" Award of the American Sociological Association (2004), and the 2007 "Viviana Zelizer Distinguished Scholarship Award" for the outstanding article published in the field of economic sociology in the previous two years.

== Work ==
Major contributions of Douglas R. White:

- White was known for Cross-cultural studies, studies of the division of labor, sexual division of labor, polygyny, marriage and kinship, his collaborative creation of the Standard Cross-Cultural Sample (SCCS), and public domain distribution of SCCS data, courseware and software, which has given way to the UCI Complex Social Science Gateway that hosts Anthropology's Ethnographics of the Lives of World Peoples along with software used in solving Galton's problem of autocorrelation for analysis of observational data, and for research on:
- Longitudinal historical evolution and field studies of human groups, larger societies, and city systems
- Mathematical modeling of social, economic, and historical dynamics, as well as statistical entailment analysis, Galton's problem, the Natchez Paradox, Structural endogamy and network simulation, regular equivalence, flow centrality, and structural cohesion,
- Social networks, including, more specifically, the network realism paradigm,
- Social complexity and complex-network system dynamics.
- Standard Cross-Cultural Sample
- System dynamics Studies of world system dynamics and urban studies, including his current studies of urban dynamics over the last millennium,

A reaction to his latest book, Network Analysis and Ethnographic Problems, by one reviewer, was that this "could be the most important book in anthropology in fifty years." His work on implications of feedback and feedforward processes, published in Physical Review in collaboration with the founder of nonextensive physics, a founder of chaos theory, and two young computer scientists, provides one of the foundational network simulations for understanding complex networks.

White's Main page hosts a public server, that if used externally at http://SocSciCompute.ss.uci.edu, offers ethnographic data, variables and tools for inference with R scripts by Dow (2007) and Eff and Dow (2009) in an NSF supported Galaxy (http://getgalaxy.org) framework (https://www.xsede.org) for instructors, students and researchers to do cross-cultural research modeling with controls for Galton's problem using Standard Cross-Cultural Sample variables at https://web.archive.org/web/20160402201432/https://dl.dropboxusercontent.com/u/9256203/SCCScodebook.txt.

== Books ==
White authored or coauthored 5 books and over 100 articles, and edited 3 books and 2 special journal issues dealing with his research interests.

- 1972, The Anthropology of Urban Environments. with Thomas Weaver. Society for Applied Anthropology, Monograph Series.
- 1975, Tuaraiscail: Report of the Committee on Language Attitudes Research Regarding Irish. 5 volumes. with Lilyan A. Brudner. Dublin: Government Printing Office.
- 1991, Research Methods in Social Network Analysis. with Linton C. Freeman and A. Kimball Romney. Transaction Publishers.
- 1998, Kinship, Networks, and Exchange : Structural Analysis in the Social Sciences, with Thomas Schweizer. Cambridge University Press.
- 2004, Network Analysis and Ethnographic Problems: Process Models of a Turkish Nomad Clan (with Ulla Johansen and Foreword by Andrey Korotayev). Lexington Press.
