= Network Analysis and Ethnographic Problems =

Science book

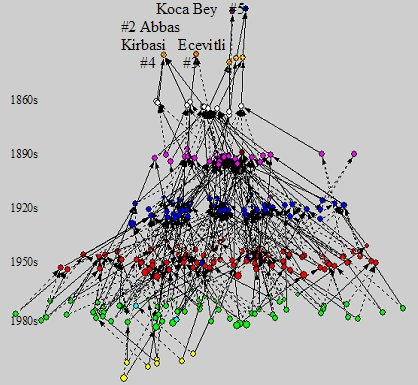
3-D Graphic of Relinking Marriages among Nomad Kin, color-coded by generations. Nodes are couples not individuals, so where downward lines meet it is a relative that is married. This is called relinking. The relinking structure and dynamic is a key to ethnographic understanding. Names of some of the lineage ancestors are shown at the top.

Network Analysis and Ethnographic Problems: Process Models of a Turkish Nomad Clan is an anthropological and complexity science book by social anthropologists Douglas R. White, University of California, Irvine, and Ulla Johansen of the University of Cologne. It is considered an important publication in anthropology and the political science of Central Asia.

The breakthrough is to code and portray the data of a longitudinal ethnography of a given people as a complex interactive system, in this case from an ethnogenesis in the late 18th century in Turkey to the present date, based on the detailed genealogies and chronicles recorded in fieldwork carried out between 1956 and 2004 recorded by ethnographer Ulla Johansen. The analysis of these data provides for an account of social dynamics relevant to many parts of the Middle East.

== Synopsis ==
The basis for the book is the complete genealogical network for a nomad community, its history, and its migrants and migrations. These form a relational web not just for description but for analysis of social dynamics. The picture that emerges is one of a complexly scalable social system that expands through reproduction, kinship alliances, and fissions, and overcomes internal conflicts and those with neighbors along routes of migration. These networks constitute a generative demographic engine for health, a potential for large sibling groups, and for extensive cooperation within and between these groups constructed through reciprocal ties of marriage. The book is lavishly illustrated with photos, network diagrams, and analytical tables showing how very simple principles of cohesion and scalable alliances between families are able to organize this social system through a series of shifting articulations at a variety of social and spatial levels. Thus continual reshuffling is capable of moving, and does move individuals and groups in the society through a variety of transformations in relation to life problems, social problems, technological problems, and the transmission and enrichment of a highly complex cultural system. The book shows how these adjust dynamically to changing social conditions.

== Pedagogy ==
This book makes major methodological, substantive, and theoretical advances for the disciplines of ethnography, social anthropology, and social history; and marks some new understandings of several of the many forms of social complexity. No previous work has been able to connect dynamical historic and social network analysis with changes that can be visualized and analyzed through time in terms of structure, interaction, and social change, using the actual concrete data of the ethnography, person by person, relation by relation, group by group, change by change. This is a level of integration hitherto never achieved in anthropology. It builds on a methodology for analysis of structural changes that was developed by the lead author. Douglas R. White had previously developed new concepts and measures for the study of social cohesion, starting first with cohesion in kinship ties (structural endogamy) and then progressing to structural cohesion generally, which has since become one of the many major tools of network analysis.

If the book combines complexity theory following lines of thought at the Santa Fe Institute with a contribution to understanding of Middle Eastern social structure, it is through combining network visualization and analysis with the study of the dynamics of marriage choices. The book expands the theory of social practice to show how changes in the structure of a society's kinship network affect the development of social cohesion over time. By rigorously examining the genealogical networks of the Turkish nomad clan and associated clans that are studied, the authors explore how changes in network cohesion are indicative of key processes of social change. This approach alters in fundamental ways the anthropological concepts of social structure, organizational dynamics, social cohesion, marriage strategies, as well as the study of community politics within the dynamics of ongoing personal interaction.

== See also ==
- Network science
- Social network analysis
- Social complexity
