= Schlaepfer =

Schlaepfer is a surname. Notable people with the surname include:

- Brian Schlaepfer (born 1927 or 1928), perpetrator of the 1992 Schlaepfer family murders in New Zealand
- Corrado Schlaepfer (1922–1980), Swiss fencer
- David Schlaepfer, American-born biologist
- Julia Schlaepfer, American actress
