= James Herbert (disambiguation) =

James Herbert (1943–2013), was an English fiction writer.

James Herbert or Jim Herbert may also refer to:

== Politicians ==
- James Herbert (died 1677) (c. 1623–1677), English politician who sat in the House of Commons variously between 1645 and 1677
- James Herbert (died 1709) (c. 1644–1709), MP for Monmouth Boroughs
- James Herbert (1660–1704), English politician

== Others ==
- James Herbert (cricketer) (1895–1957), Australian cricketer
- James Herbert (director) (born 1938), American painter and film director
- Jimmy Herbert (1897–1968), Canadian professional ice hockey player
- James D. Herbert (art historian) (born 1959), professor and chair of the art history department at the University of California Irvine
- James D. Herbert (psychologist) (born 1962), psychologist, professor, and university administrator
- Jim Herbert (runner) (1915-1997), winner of the 600 yards at the 1941 USA Indoor Track and Field Championships
