= Petroleum benzine =

Hydrocarbon-based solvent mixture enriched with C6 alkanes

Petroleum benzine is a hydrocarbon-based solvent mixture that is classified by its physical properties (e.g. boiling point, vapor pressure) rather than a specific chemical composition.

The chemical composition of a petroleum distillate can be modified to result in a solvent with a reduced concentration of unsaturated hydrocarbons, i.e. alkenes, by hydrotreating and/or reduced aromatics, e.g. benzene, toluene, xylene, by several dearomatization methods. The most important distinction amongst the various hydrocarbon solvents may be their boiling/distillation ranges (and, by association, volatility, flash point, etc.) and aromatic content.

Given the toxicity/carcinogenicity of some aromatic hydrocarbons, most notably benzene, the aromatic content of petroleum distillate solvents, which would typically be in the 10–25% (w/w) range for most petroleum fractions, can be advantageously reduced when their unique solvation properties are not required, and a less odorous, lower toxicity solvent is desired, especially when present in consumer products.

Petroleum benzine appears synonymous with petroleum spirit. Petroleum spirit is generally considered to be the fractions between the very lightest hydrocarbons, petroleum ether, and the heavier distillates, mineral spirits. For example, petroleum benzine with a boiling range of 36 – 83 °C sold by EMD Millipore under CAS-No. 64742-49-0 is identified in the product MSDS as hydrotreated light petroleum distillates comprising ≥ 90% C5-C7 hydrocarbons, n-alkanes, isoalkanes, and < 5% n-hexane, while Santa Cruz Biotechnology sells a petroleum ether product under the same CAS-No.

According to their corresponding MSDS, most commercially offered petroleum benzine solvents consist of paraffins (alkanes) with chain lengths of C5 to C9 (i.e. n-pentane to n-nonane and their isomers), cycloparaffins (cyclopentane, cyclohexane, ethylcyclopentane, etc.) and aromatic hydrocarbons (benzene, toluene, xylene, etc.).

The Toxic Substances Control Act Definition 2008 describes petroleum benzine as "a complex combination of hydrocarbons obtained by treating a petroleum fraction with hydrogen in the presence of a catalyst. It consists of hydrocarbons having carbon numbers predominantly in the range of C4 through C11 and boiling in the range of approximately −20°C to 190°C."

== Health concerns ==
Beginning in the 1960s and 70s, the high incidence rate of polyneuropathy amongst industrial workers chronically exposed to petroleum benzine and other hydrocarbon solvents prompted investigations into the safety of chronic exposure to petroleum distillates.

Many of the cases of polyneuropathy amongst workers chronically exposed to vapors of petroleum benzine and similar solvents have been attributed to the n-hexane component of these mixtures.

Using an animal model (Wistar-strain male rats), it was reported that chronic exposure (12 h a day for 24 weeks) to hydrocarbon solvent vapors conspicuously impaired peripheral nerve function in the 500 ppm n-hexane group, slightly impaired in the 200 ppm n-hexane group and petroleum benzine II group (containing 500 ppm n-hexane), and barely impaired in the petroleum benzine I group (containing 200 ppm n-hexane).

These results suggest that some components in petroleum benzine are likely to antagonize the neurotoxic effects of n-hexane to the peripheral nerves, possibly by inhibiting the oxidation of n-hexane to its more toxic metabolites 2-hexanone and 2,5-hexanedione.

Depressed body weight gains amongst the exposed groups compared to the control group were observed in the order: petroleum benzine II > petroleum benzine I (containing 200 ppm n-hexane) >> 500 ppm n-hexane > 200 ppm n-hexane. These results suggest that other components found in petroleum benzine may have additive, synergistic or potentiative effects on the biological effects of n-hexane. Namely, 1000 ppm n-hexane, 3000 ppm n-heptane, and 1000 ppm toluene were reported to have depressing effects on the body weight gain of rats.
