= Coca-Cola sign =

Sculpture in Times Square, New York City

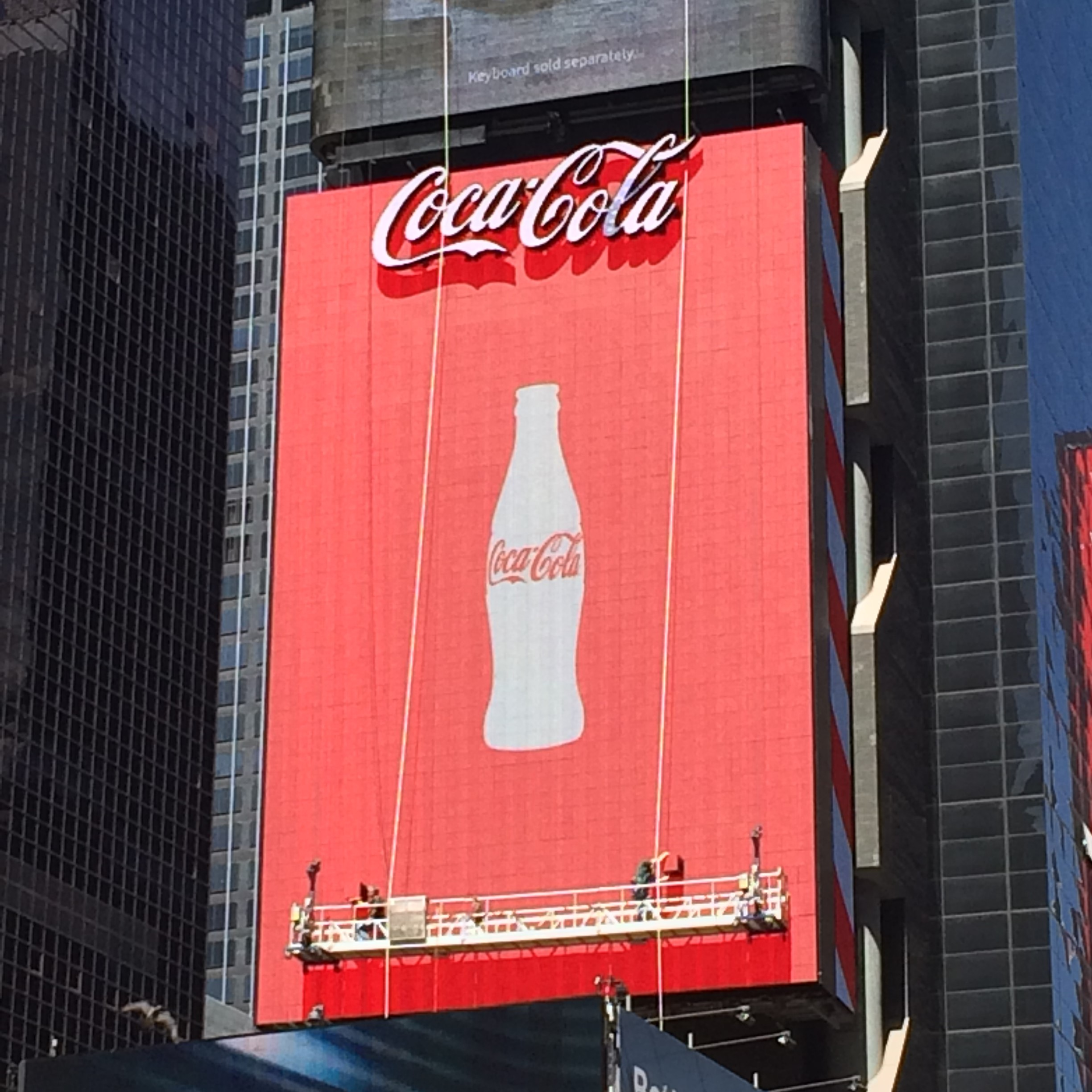
The current Coca-Cola Sign under maintenance shortly after completion.

The Coca-Cola sign is an electro-kinetic sculpture on the Two Times Square building in Times Square, Manhattan, New York City. Installed in 2017, it is the latest iteration of Coca-Cola advertising at the site since the early 20th century.

== Details ==
The current sign measures approximately 68 by 42 feet (21 by 13 m) and contains 1,760 LED cubes that can move independently. The cubes are programmed to move in several preset configurations over the course of the day. Construction started with the removal of the existing sign in February 2017, and premiered on August 8 of the same year. After completion, Guinness World Records noted it as the world's "first 3-D robotic billboard".

The sign was designed and built by space150 and Radius Displays, with sign testing, management, and assembly handled by other businesses.

== Previous Signs ==
=== Early signs (1920–2003) ===
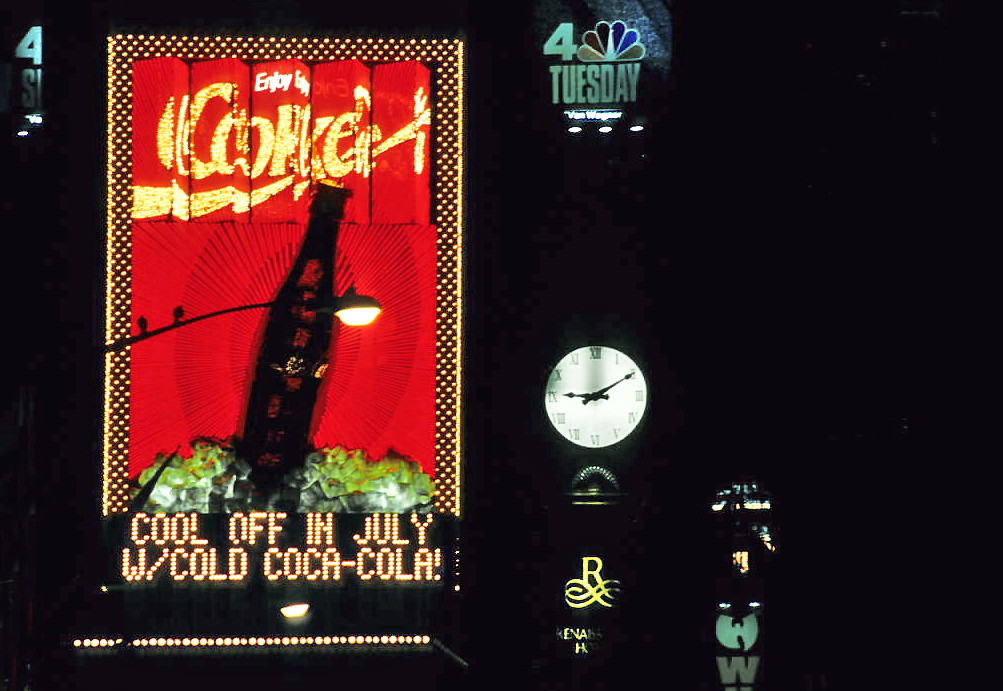
The 1991 Coca-Cola sign (pictured 1997)

The first Coca-Cola billboard in Times Square debuted in 1920 at 49th Street and Broadway, with neon lighting later added in 1923. It flashed the words "Drink Coca-Cola, Delicious and Refreshing", and was the world's second-largest electric billboard at the time.

This sign was replaced in 1932 with a new model on 47th Street which featured a soda jerk, and was replaced again in the 1960s with a simpler sign reading "The Pause That Refreshes." By the mid 1960s, the slogan had been changed to "Things Go Better With Coke."

In late October 1969, Coca-Cola embarked on a multimillion-dollar advertising campaign, which included a new logo for the company; the trademark was housed in a square with a "dynamic ribbon" near the bottom. A large electric sign, which alternated the new look and slogan "It's the Real Thing" in vibrant red and white colors, was installed at Times Square and remained for over 20 years.

The sign wouldn't be updated again until 1991. A $3 million, neon-illuminated display was introduced, featuring a larger-than-life Coke bottle protruding from the billboard's surface. The bottle was the world's largest Coca-Cola bottle, and the sign featured both daytime and evening routines.

=== 2004 sign ===
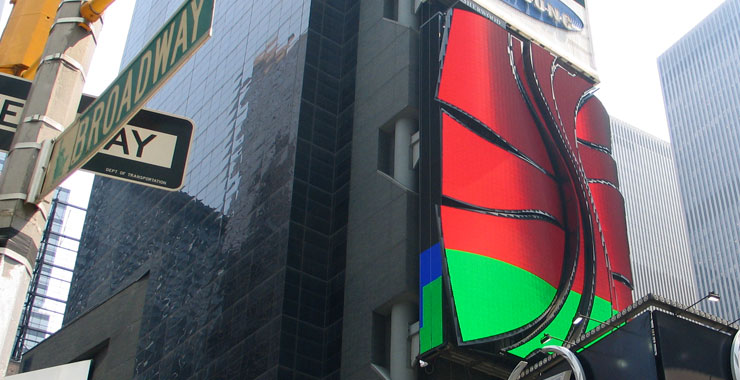
The 2004 Coca-Cola sign

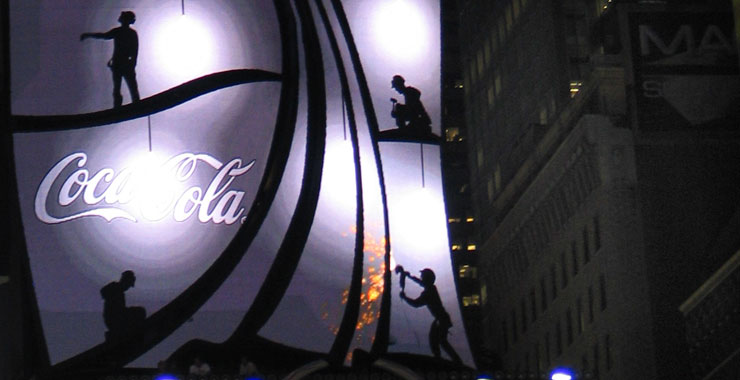
At the unveiling of the 2004 Coca-Cola sign, silhouettes of construction workers add the final touches

To replace the 1991 sign, the Coca-Cola Company and New York's Museum of Modern Art selected design firm Brand Architecture, Inc.'s submission from fifteen other candidates across the United States. The multi-layered design had a complex pattern of stainless steel planes and exposed superstructure, inspired by Manhattan's steel and glass monoliths and the frenetic pace of Midtown traffic. The three-dimensional composition rendered Coke's "Dynamic Ribbon" motif in both positive form and negative space. Built by digital display manufacturer Daktronics and titled "Simply Coke," the sign was covered in programmable LEDs and allowed graphics to be displayed, including live video streaming. The sign attained 180-degree visibility by sculpting LED panels around the 8 foot (2.4 m) horizontal thrust.

Wright Massey, owner of Brand Architecture Inc. and creator of the sign, said, "We realized that a vibrant, simple design would draw focus in the frenzied pandemonium of Times Square. Drawing from recent Coca-Cola marketing research, we found the Dynamic Ribbon Device the best vehicle for conveying key brand values. We wanted a contemporary, authentic statement, full of energy, optimism, and youthful spirit. We wanted our sculpture to inspire consumers on all three emotional levels: head, heart and gut."

During the unveiling ceremony on July 1, 2004, which was also in the middle of an advertising campaign for Coca Cola C2, the sign showed "The Time Machine", a tribute to the past of Coca Cola and New York City, soon after activation.

== See also ==
- Candler Building, the former Coca-Cola headquarters on 42nd Street
