= Carter Beats the Devil =

2001 novel by Glen David Gold

- 1st Edition Cover (2001) of Carter Beats the Devil published by Hyperion Books
- Author: Glen David Gold
- Illustrator: (Reprints of posters) Nielsen Poster Collection
- Language: English
- Genre: Historical Mystery Thriller novel
- Publisher: Hyperion Books (US); Sceptre (UK)
- Publication date: 16 August 2001
- Publication place: United States
- Media type: Print (hardback)
- Pages: 576 (hardback, 2001)
- ISBN: 978-0-340-79497-5
- OCLC: 46847982

Carter Beats the Devil is a historical mystery thriller novel by Glen David Gold centred on the American stage magician Charles Joseph Carter (1874–1936).

== Novel's title ==
The title of the novel comes from Carter's evening length stage show, the third act of which is called "Carter Beats the Devil" and features Carter in a magician's duel with an assistant made up as the Devil.

== Summary ==
The 1920s was a golden age for stage magic and Charles Carter is an American stage magician at the height of his fame and powers. At the climax of his latest touring stage show, Carter invites United States President Warren G. Harding on to stage to take part in his act. In front of an audience, Carter proceeds to chop the president into pieces, cut off his head, and feed him to a lion, before restoring him to health. The show is a success, but two hours later the president is dead, and Carter finds himself the centre of some intrusive focus from individuals indeed.

== Plot ==
This novel is a fictionalised biography of Charles Joseph Carter. The main character, Carter, is followed through his career, from his first encounter with magic to his last performance. Along the way he encounters many historical figures, including fellow magicians Harry Houdini and Howard Thurston, United States President Warren G. Harding, BMW founder Max Friz, the Marx Brothers, business magnate Francis Marion "Borax" Smith, the inventor of electronic television Philo Farnsworth, and San Franciscan madams Tessie Wall and Jessie Hayman.

Most of the novel centres on the mysterious death of President Harding, who dies shortly after taking part in Carter's stage show. President Harding apparently knew of many serious scandals that seemed likely to bring down the establishment and it seems certain that he was assassinated by persons and methods unknown. Much of Carter's past is shown in the form of flashbacks as U.S. Secret Service Agent Griffin investigates the magician as a suspect.

The flashbacks chart Carter's early career including his first encounter with a magic trick, shown to him by "the tallest man alive", Joe Sullivan (also an actual, if obscure, historical figure) in a fairground sideshow, his first paid performance for Borax Smith, his rivalry with the magician "Mysterioso", his first meeting with Harry Houdini who bestows the title "Carter the Great" on him, and Carter's marriage to Sarah Annabelle.

Unbeknownst to Agent Griffin, President Harding passed a great secret to Carter: a young inventor named Philo Farnsworth has a new invention called television. Television is wanted by both the radio industry and the military and they are hunting Carter to get it. Carter must draw on all his magic to escape kidnapping and death as he seeks out the inventor. Along the way Carter meets a young blind woman with a mysterious past and encounters a deadly rival.

Finally, in a magic show to end all magic shows, Carter must truly beat the devil if he is to save Farnsworth and his magical invention.

== Characters ==
- Charles Carter (Carter the Great): Title character, American stage magician, based on Charles Joseph Carter, whose biography was written by Mike Caveney.
- James Carter: Carter The Great's younger brother and business manager.
- President Warren G. Harding: Real life President of the United States who is the victim of an apparent assassination plot.
- Agent Jack Griffin: Secret Service Agent and veteran who failed to prevent the assassination of President William McKinley and perhaps also of President Harding.
- Harry Houdini: Real life escape artist and magician who bestows the title "Carter The Great" on Charles Carter.
- Mysterioso: Carter's great rival, a magician who makes an enemy of Houdini and later returns seeking revenge.
- (Sarah) Annabelle Bernhardt: Assistant to Mysterioso and later Carter, also Carter's love interest and first wife.
- Borax Smith, "the richest man alive": Real life business magnate Francis Marion Smith who pays Carter for his first performance and assists both Carter and Phoebe Kyle.
- Phoebe Kyle: Carter's love interest for much of the novel and eventually second wife. Blinded in a fire, but saved by Borax Smith.
- Max Friz: In real life the founder of BMW, who presents Carter with a motorcycle for publicity purposes.
- Agents Hollis, O'Brien and Stutz: Secret Service agents who are enemies of both Carter and Agent Griffin.
- Olive White: Librarian who assists Agent Jack Griffin.
- Captain Tulang: Indonesian pirate who takes Carter's company captive and robs them. Tulang is named for Tulang Island in the Philippine municipality of San Francisco. Much of the book is set in the somewhat more famous city of San Francisco, California.
- Philo Farnsworth: Real life inventor of electronic television and also of the fusor fusion device.

== Allusions/references ==
=== To other works ===
Carter Beats the Devil refers to many famous magic acts of the early twentieth century, and contains reprints of many theatrical posters from magic acts of the period.

In the afterword of the book, author Glen David Gold credits the writings of Nevil Maskelyne, David Devant, Robert Houdin, Howard Thurston, F. B. Nightingale, Augustus Rapp, T. Nelson Downs, James Randi, Harry Kellar, Ottawa Keyes, Ricky Jay and Walter B. Gibson.

The author also credits Carter the Great by Mike Caveney as a non-fiction biography of the real Charles Joseph Carter.

Other books the author mentions using for research include:

- The Illustrated History of Magic by Milbourne Christopher
- Curious Punishments of Bygone Days by Alice Morse Earle
- The Madams of San Francisco by Curt Gentry
- The Technology of Orgasm by Rachel P. Maines
- Harpo Speaks by Harpo Marx
- Magic: A Pictorial History of Conjurers in the Theater by David Price
- The Shadow of Blooming Grove: Warren G. Harding in His Times by Francis Russell
- Houdini!!!: The Career of Ehrich Weiss by Kenneth Silvermann
- Starling of the White House by Edmund Starling
- The American Black Chamber by Herbert Yardley

A number of traditional songs are sung in Carter Beats the Devil including "What Shall We Do With A Drunken Sailor?", "Blow the Man Down", "Sugar In The Hold" and "Good-bye Fare Thee Well", though only the lyrics of the first song are actually reprinted.

=== To 1920s culture ===
- The main character, Carter the Great, is based on Charles Joseph Carter, an actual magician whose biography was written by Mike Caveney. An article about the real Charles Joseph Carter was written by John R. Browne III and published in the winter 2001 edition of the "Frisco Cricket", a periodical produced by the San Francisco Traditional Jazz Foundation. As of 15 November 2007 an online copy of the article was available at the foundation's website here.
- Harry Houdini, Warren G. Harding, Philo Farnsworth, Francis Marion "Borax" Smith, Max Friz, Tessie Wall, Jessie Hayman, and Joe Sullivan amongst others featured in the story were all real people.
- Carter meets The Marx Brothers while they are still performing as a sketch troupe called "Fun In Hi-Skule", which is an actual act the brothers performed as young men. They are referred in the book by their actual names Adolph, Leonard and Julius instead of Harpo, Chico and Groucho.
- The slow decline of the music hall and theatre industry in the face of cinema, radio and eventually television is portrayed in the book.
- The central plot revolves around the apparent murder of United States President Warren G. Harding. In fact President Harding did die on the date given in the book, in a San Francisco hotel. However, the cause was pneumonia after a bout of food poisoning. (Before the development of penicillin based medicines pneumonia and similar common infections were often fatal, even for those with access to the best medical care.) Also referred to are a large number of political scandals that plagued President Harding's administration.
- Philo Farnsworth did invent a form of electronic television (see History of television) and many elements of his design continued to be used with cathode-ray tube television sets throughout their production.
- Borax Smith, real name Francis Marion Smith, was an American business magnate and real estate developer who constructed much of Oakland, California.

== Reception ==
=== Critical reception ===
Janet Maslin in the Books of the Times section of The New York Times called Carter Beats the Devil "an enormously assured first novel...no small feat of legerdemain." A. L. Kennedy in The Observer stated that "Carter Beats the Devil is a big, mischievous, intelligent read – nice to see a bit of magic in fiction again".

== Release details ==
- 2001, United Kingdom, Hodder & Stoughton, ISBN 0-340-79497-6, Pub date 16 August 2001, Hardback (First Edition)
- 2001, Hyperion Books, ISBN 0-7868-6734-5, Pub date 2001, Hardback
- 2002, United Kingdom, Sceptre, ISBN 0-340-79499-2, Pub date 16 May 2002, Paperback
- 2003, United Kingdom, Hodder & Stoughton Audio Books, ISBN 1-84032-855-X, Pub date 4 August 2003, Audio CD & Tape
- 2006, United Kingdom, Sceptre, ISBN 0-340-93627-4, Pub date 28 December 2006, Paperback
