= Glen David Gold =

American writer

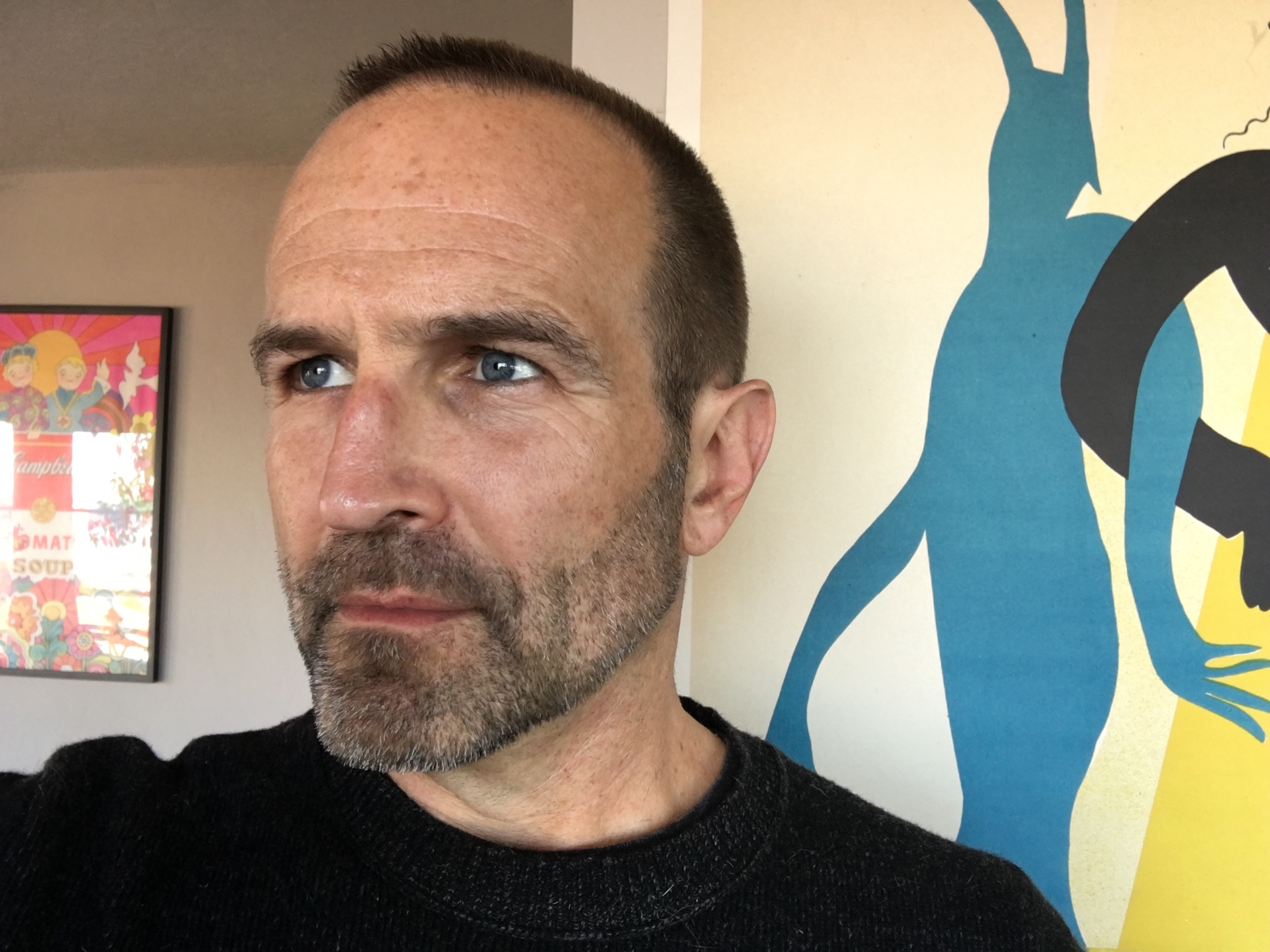
- Glen David Gold in 2018
- Born: 1964 (age 61–62); Corona del Mar, California, U.S.
- Education: The Thacher School; Wesleyan University; University of California, Berkeley; University of California, Irvine (MFA)
- Occupations: Novelist; memoirist; screenwriter
- Spouses: Alice Sebold (m. 2001; div. 2012) Sara Shay (m. 2023)
- Writing career
- Notable works: Carter Beats the Devil; Sunnyside, I Will Be Complete

Glen David Gold (born 1964) is an American novelist, memoirist and screenwriter. Known for his bestselling novels exploring the roles of entertainment and popular culture in historical America, he has also published a critically acclaimed memoir and worked extensively in a broad range of media, including comics, television and podcasting. Gold is also a collector of and authority on comics and graphic novels, particularly the works of Jack Kirby and other architects of the Marvel Universe.

== Biography ==
Gold was born in Corona del Mar, California, the son of a recording industry executive and a British expatriate mother. His parents divorced when he was ten years old. Relocated to San Francisco, he grew up in a milieu of 70s-era Bohemianism "by the side of his increasingly erratic mother, among con men and get-rich schemes." When he was twelve, she moved to New York without telling him, leaving him to fend for himself with minimal long-distance support. Despite his unorthodox childhood, he was admitted to The Thacher School in Ojai, California. He later studied at Wesleyan University, then transferred to the University of California at Berkeley, where he completed his undergraduate degree. He worked as a freelance writer before entering the graduate writing program at University of California, Irvine, where he received his MFA in creative writing.

He is married to Sara Shay. An earlier marriage to novelist Alice Sebold spanned from 2001 to their divorce in 2012.

Gold currently lives in the Silver Lake region of Los Angeles.

== Books ==
=== Carter Beats the Devil ===
His first novel, Carter Beats the Devil (2001) was a national bestseller, receiving critical praise and translation into 14 languages. The New Yorker described it as "A magical first novel...one of the most entertaining appearing acts of recent years." Janet Maslin of The New York Times called it "an enormously assured first novel... no small feat of legerdemain." A. L. Kennedy in The Observer stated that "Carter Beats the Devil is a big, mischievous, intelligent read – nice to see a bit of magic in fiction again". The book was a 2001 Washington Post Notable Book of the Year, a Christian Science Monitor Best Book of the Year, and shortlisted for the 2001 Guardian First Book Award.

The novel is a fictionalised biography of the American stage magician Charles Joseph Carter (1874–1936), following Carter through his career, from his first encounter with magic to his last performance. Along the way he encounters many historical figures, including fellow magicians Harry Houdini and Howard Thurston, United States President Warren G. Harding, BMW founder Max Friz, the Marx Brothers, business magnate Francis Marion Smith, the inventor of electronic television Philo Farnsworth, and San Franciscan madams Tessie Wall and Jessie Hayman. Most of the novel centers on the mysterious death of President Harding, who dies shortly after taking part in Carter's stage show. President Harding apparently knew of many serious scandals that seemed likely to bring down the establishment, and it seems certain that he was assassinated by persons and methods unknown. Much of Carter's past is shown in the form of flashbacks, as U.S. Secret Service Agent Griffin investigates the magician as a suspect.

=== Sunnyside ===
Gold's second novel, Sunnyside (2009) was also both critically well received and a national bestseller. Once again interweaving real historical figures and events into a tapestry of fiction, the novel begins in 1916, when a mass delusion results in no less than eight hundred sightings of Charlie Chaplin, appearing simultaneously at various locations throughout the world. It then traces the life and career of Chaplin himself, while "we are introduced to a dazzling cast of characters that take us from the battlefields of France to the Russian Revolution and from the budding glamour of Hollywood to madcap Wild West shows.". Called "Ingenious...a thoughtful commentary on the creation of celebrity in modern America" by The New Yorker, Sunnyside was described by The Christian Science Monitor as "a big book crammed with big ideas and ambitions, and, with its multiple plots and mix of history and fiction, it's easy to see why many reviews have compared it to the work of E.L. Doctorow . . . full of intelligence, ambition, and generosity."

=== I Will Be Complete ===
Gold's first memoir, I Will Be Complete, was published in 2018 by Knopf in the United States and by Hodder & Stoughton in the United Kingdom. Lev Grossman, author of The Magicians, called it "[a]n extraordinary account of an extraordinary life," and Joseph Fink, co-author of Welcome to Night Vale, said Gold "is one of the best storytellers working today. He could write about anything and make it gripping."

== Other media ==
Gold's essays, journalism and short fiction have appeared in The New York Times Sunday Magazine, Playboy, McSweeney's, and Wired, among other publications.

His work in television includes writing an episode of the Nickelodeon series Hey Arnold!, and an appearance in the documentary Houdini: Unlocking the Mystery. He co-wrote an episode of the popular podcast Welcome to Night Vale in 2013, contributed to another episode in 2014, and wrote the three-episode arc "eGemony" in 2017.

Gold has also ventured into comic books, writing storylines for Dark Horse Comics's Escapist, as well as a reprise of Will Eisner's classic creation The Spirit for DC Comics. In 2019, Marvel Comics commissioned him to write a script for Marvel Comics #1000, a special edition anthology of original stories and artwork commemorating Marvel's 80th anniversary. Entitled "The Tender, Flaky Taste of Weltschmerz", the story enlists Howard the Duck in an affectionate send-up of advertisements for Hostess Fruit Pies, once ubiquitous in Marvel comics ("a delight in every bite").

== As commentator on comics and comic art ==
Gold was a voracious reader of comics "when I was a kid in the 1970s" but had moved on to reading science fiction as well as the works of Robertson Davies and John Irving by the age of thirteen. In 1992, convinced that "[s]ome comic artwork can belong on gallery walls — not just as 'low' art but as something important on its own," he began collecting original art from both comics and graphic novels as well as commissioning original art from artists including Gene Colan and Herb Trimpe.

In 2005, the Hammer Museum and the Los Angeles Museum of Contemporary Art invited him to contribute an essay on Jack Kirby to their exhibit Masters of American Comics, billed as an event "to establish a canon of fifteen of the most influential artists working in the medium throughout the 20th century."; the catalogue was published by Yale University Press. In 2015, the exhibit Comic Book Apocalypse: The Graphic World of Jack Kirby, presented at California State University, Northridge, commissioned Gold to contribute an essay as well. The resulting work, titled "The Red Sheet", was one of the first critical essays to connect Kirby's harrowing experiences as a combat infantryman in World War II with his distinctive approach to comics, postulating that Kirby's creation of Captain America may have been an attempt to mediate (and personify) the effects of Post Traumatic Stress Syndrome. "Here's something we tend not to think of when evaluating Jack Kirby's artistic intent: Kirby killed Nazis, and he did it in hand-to-hand combat." Gold wrote. "He did it with the same hands that drew Captain America and Thor...in fact, he was wrestling with such deep nuances about the intermingled natures of good and evil that they're only comprehensible when viewed through the effects of wartime experience."

== Bibliography ==
- —— (2001). Carter Beats the Devil. Hyperion Books. ISBN 9780786886326.
- —— (2009). Sunnyside. Knopf. ISBN 9780307454980.
- —— (2018). I Will Be Complete. Knopf. ISBN 9781101946398.
