= David Kirkby =

Cosmologist

- Education: University of Toronto (BA, 1989) California Institute of Technology (PhD, 1995)
- Scientific career
- Fields: Cosmology
- Workplaces: Stanford University; University of California, Irvine (2001-present)
- Website: https://faculty.sites.uci.edu/dkirkby/

David Kirkby is a cosmologist and professor at the department of physics and astronomy at University of California, Irvine (UCI).

== Early life and education ==
Kirkby grew up in England and Canada. He graduated with a Bachelor's Degree in mathematics and physics from the University of Toronto in 1989. He moved to the United States to attend the California Institute of Technology and earned his PhD in particle physics in 1995.

== Career ==
Kirkby had a postdoctoral fellowship at Stanford University.

Kirkby joined University of California, Irvine (UCI) in 2001 and is a cosmologist and professor at the department of physics and astronomy at UCI. When he joined, Kirkby studied particle physics, but now researches the origin of the universe and cosmic acceleration. He also holds a joint appointment at the department of electrical engineering and computer science at UCI.

== Awards and honors ==
In 2007, Kirkby was elected a member of the American Physical Society for "outstanding contributions to the experimental study and understanding of mixing and CP violation in the neutral B meson system, and for the development of data modeling and analysis software used throughout the high energy physics community."

== See also ==
- List of fellows of the American Physical Society (1998–2010)
- List of University of Toronto alumni
- List of California Institute of Technology people
- List of University of California, Irvine people
