= Frederic Wan =

American applied mathematician

Frederic Yui-Ming Wan
- Born: January 7, 1936 (age 90); Shanghai, China
- Occupations: Applied mathematician, academic, author and consultant
- Awards: The Arthur Beaumont Distinguished Service Award, Canadian Applied Mathematics Society; Foreign Member, Russian Academy of Natural Sciences; Fellow, American Academy of Mechanics (AAM); Fellow, American Society of Mechanical Engineers (ASME); Fellow, American Association for the Advancement of Science (AAAS); Fellow, Society for Industrial and Applied Mathematics (SIAM)

Academic background
- Education: S.B., Mathematics(1959); S.M., Mathematics (1963); Ph.D., Mathematics (1965)
- Alma mater: Massachusetts Institute of Technology (MIT)

Frederic Yui-Ming Wan is a Chinese-American applied mathematician, academic, author and consultant. He is a Professor Emeritus of Mathematics at the University of California, Irvine (UCI), and an Affiliate Professor of Applied Mathematics at the University of Washington (UW).

Wan is most known for his research in applied mathematics, theoretical mechanics, resource economics, and biomathematics. He is the author of more than 150 archival journal research publications and 6 books. These and some of his educational and service programs have been recognized by his election as a Fellow of the American Academy of Mechanics (AAM), American Society of Mechanical Engineers (ASME), American Association for the Advancement of Science (AAAS), and Society for Industrial and Applied Mathematics (SIAM). There are two Lecture Series (at UCI and UW, respectively) in honor of him and his wife Julia and a conference room in his name in Lewis Hall at UW that houses the Department of Applied Mathematics.

== Early life and education ==
Wan was born in 1936 in Shanghai, China to Olga Jung Wan and Wai-nam Wan. While his parents relocated to Paris France to work in the Chinese Embassy in the same year, Wan grew up in the care of his grandparents and went to school in Saigon and Cholon before he left for Seattle in 1954 as a derived citizen of an American mother.

Wan graduated from Garfield High School of Seattle in 1955, and headed for undergraduate study at the Massachusetts Institute of Technology (MIT). In his freshman year, Wan pledged and was initiated into the Theta Deuteron chapter of the Theta Delta Chi fraternity at MIT. He received an S.B. degree in mathematics in 1959 and earned his S.M. and Ph.D. degrees in mathematics at the same institute in 1963 and 1965, respectively. His doctoral dissertation, "Twisting and Stretching of Helicoidal Shells", was supervised by E. Reissner.

== Career ==
After receiving his SB at MIT, Wan served as a Research Staff Member at the MIT Lincoln Laboratory from 1959 to 1965. Upon receiving his Ph.D. in mathematics, he held a postdoctoral appointment as an instructor of mathematics at MIT, was promoted to assistant professor of Applied Mathematics in 1967, and to associate professor in 1969. From 1974 till 1983, he served as a professor of mathematics at the University of British Columbia (UBC), but left in 1983 for the University of Washington (UW) as Professor of Applied Mathematics. In 1995, he moved to the University of California, Irvine (UCI), as a Professor Mathematics with a joint appointment as Professor of Mechanical and Aerospace Engineering. From 1999 till 2005, he also held an appointment as Professor of Civil and Environmental Engineering. He retired from his regular faculty position at UCI in 2017 and became Professor Emeritus of Mathematics.

Along with academic appointments, Wan also held a number of administrative positions in his career. In relocating to UBC in 1974, Wan also accepted the appointment as the first Director of the new Institute of Applied Mathematics and Statistics. While in Canada, he helped establish the Canadian Applied Mathematics Society and served as its President in 1981–83. He also served as member (1980–82) and Chair (1982–83) of the Committee of Pure and Applied Mathematics of Natural Sciences and Engineering Research Council (NSERC), the counterpart of the American National Science Foundation (NSF). In 1983, Wan moved to the University of Washington as the founding chair to establish its new Department of Applied Mathematics. In 1988, he assumed the Divisional Deanship of the Natural and Mathematical Sciences of the College of Arts and Sciences at UW and served until his temporary assignment in 1992 to become the Director of the Division of Mathematical Sciences of NSF. By assuming that position, Wan became the only person to have headed the government civilian funding agency for basic research in pure and applied mathematics in both Canada and the United States.

In 1995, he was appointed Vice Chancellor for Research and Dean of Graduate Studies at UCI. Upon completing his five-year term of these appointments and returning to full-time faculty status in Mathematics in 2000, Wan led a team of research collaborators to develop an Interdisciplinary Gateway Graduate Program in Mathematical and Computational Biology (MCB) in 2007. He then extended similar educational opportunities to undergraduates (by the MCB for Undergraduate Program in 2011) and post-doctoral researchers (by a National Short Course on System Biology in 2010). He served as the Founding Director of these programs with funding support from the Howard Hughes Medical Institute (HHMI), National Institutes of Health (NIH) and the National Science Foundation (NSF).

Wan has been engaged periodically as a consultant to industries and government on new problems involving mechanical structures. The most impactful one among these was a design study leading to the flexible lid that provides an air-tight seal to the household Tupperware container.

== Research ==
Wan's research interests span fields of applied mathematics and their applications. He has more than 150 research articles and five books in the fields of theoretical and applied mechanics, resource economics, neurosciences, viral dynamics, and developmental and cell biology. His first publication on exhaustible resource economics (with R. M. Solow), foundations of plate and shell theory (with R.D. Gregory) and the morphogen transport (with A.D. Lander and Q. Nie) constitute his seminal work in these three areas, respectively.

=== Applied mathematics ===
In the broad area of applied mathematics, Wan's research generally pertains to variational and perturbation methods for exact and asymptotic solutions for problems in ODE and PDE. In the application of matched asymptotic expansions methods to residential land use and fishery problems, critical point analysis to exhaustible resource management and optimal control techniques to forest harvest rotations and the life cycle of the infectious Chlamydia bacterium, he introduced the use of a number of mathematical methods originally developed for physical sciences and engineering to scientific areas outside these fields.

=== Theoretical and applied mechanics ===
Wan's interest in theoretical mechanics started with his work on the large Haystack 37m Radio Antenna Project at Lincoln Laboratory of MIT for determining the distortion of thin paraboloidal shell of revolution. His research in this area centers on the elasto-statics of beam, plate and shell structures: the solution of specific boundary value problems (BVP) by one and two-dimensional theories for these three-dimensional structures and how they relate to the three-dimensional theory of elasticity (with the latter known as the foundations of beam, plate and shell theories). A principal contribution in the former category would be the reduction of large number of equations (as many as 30) for shell theories to two simultaneous equations of the Reissner and Marguerre types for the more restricted theories of axisymmetric deformations of the shells of revolution and shallow shells. A fundamental contribution in the latter category would be the determination of the interior (or outer-asymptotic expansion) solution for a BVP (for a plate or shell structure) independent of the boundary layer solution components of the corresponding exact solution. While the result reduces to the well-known Saint-Venant's principle for stress BVP, his work (jointly with R.D. Gregory) extends this well-known principle to cover the problems with mixed and pure displacement boundary data.

=== Mathematical life sciences ===
Wan had worked with the economist Robert M. Solow on the economics of exhaustible resources while at MIT. That area of his activities was broadened to include the economics and management of renewable resources such as fishery and forestry as well as neuroscience when he relocated to UBC. After relocating to UCI, Wan fully committed to research and education in mathematical projects for the life sciences.

Wan initiated research collaboration with Qing Nie of Mathematics and Arthur Lander and J. Lawrence Marsh of Developmental and Cell Biology. Their initial project was to address a controversy on diffusion as a transport mechanism for morphogen in the extracellular space leading to his first of many publications in this area of life sciences. Among his other publications in mathematical biology, a recent work relating (by the Maximum Principle in optimal control theory) the life cycle of the infectious disease Chlamydia to the bacteria's drive for competitive survival shows the utility of (the Maximum Principle in) optimal control theory in the bio-theoretics of natural selection.

== Books ==
Wan is the author of 6 books. His book Mathematical Models and Their Analysis, originally published in 1989, was reviewed by W.J. Satzer who wrote that "One of the real strengths of the book is the depth of experience teaching mathematical modeling that the author displays." The book has been republished in the SIAM Classics Series in Applied Mathematics in 2018.

In his 1995 book Introduction to the Calculus of Variations and Its Applications, Wan has provided a detailed introduction to the calculus of variations and optimal control. R. Grinnell is of the view that "the author [of the book] is distinguished applied mathematician and his experience in pedagogy is realized through a style of exposition that is lively, personable, and very clear. This is definitely a book to be read and enjoyed."

At the end of a lengthy review of Dynamical System Models in the Life Sciences and Their Underlying Scientific Issues, Reviewer J. Ibbotson found himself "... somewhat "out of breath" at the finish line — this is a compressed and driven journey through a large amount of mathematics."

Wan’s 2019 book Stochastic Models in the Life Sciences and their Methods of Analysis was described by a review for CHOICE as "impressively accessible" and "approachable for biologists at all levels, including those interested in deepening their skills in mathematical modeling and those who seek an overview to aid them in communicating with collaborators in mathematics and statistics."

His latest book entitled Spatial Dynamics Models in the Life Sciences and the Role of Feedback in Robust Developments was published by World Scientific in 2023.

== Personal life ==
Wan has been married Julia Y.S. Chang since 1960.

== Awards and honors ==
- 1981 – Fellow, American Academy of Mechanics (AAM) (elected Secretary of the Fellows 1984 and President of the Academy in 1992)
- 1987 - Fellow, American Society of Mechanical Engineers (ASME)
- 1991 - The Arthur Beaumont Distinguished Service Award, Canadian Applied Mathematics Society
- 1994 - Certification of Recognition, National Science Foundation
- 1994 - Silver Anniversary Honor for Service as Academy President, American Academy of Mechanics
- 1995 - Fellow, American Association for the Advancement of Science (AAAS)
- 1999 - Foreign Member, Russian Academy of Natural Sciences
- 2004 - Visiting Chair Professorship, Zhou Pei – Yuan Center for Applied Mathematics, Tsinghua University, Beijing
- 2004 - Teaching Excellence, Division of Undergraduate Education (DUE), UCI
- 2005– 2010 - President of UCI Chapter, Sigma Xi (elected Associate Member in 1963 and Member in 1965, MIT Chapter)
- 2006 - UCI Chancellor's Award for Excellence in Fostering Undergraduate Research
- 2006 - Outstanding Contributions to Undergraduate Education award, School of Physical Sciences, UCI
- 2010 - Fellow, Society for Industrial and Applied Mathematics (SIAM)

== Bibliography ==
=== Selected articles ===
- Solow, R. M., & Wan, F. Y. (1976). Extraction costs in the theory of exhaustible resources. The Bell Journal of Economics, 359–370.
- Lander, A. D., Nie, Q., & Wan, F. Y. (2002). Do morphogen gradients arise by diffusion?. Developmental cell, 2(6), 785–796.
- Mizutani, C. M., Nie, Q., Wan, F. Y., Zhang, Y. T., Vilmos, P., Sousa-Neves, R., ... & Lander, A. D. (2005). Formation of the BMP activity gradient in the Drosophila embryo. Developmental cell, 8(6), 915–924.
- Lo, W. C., Chou, C. S., Gokoffski, K. K., Wan, F. Y. M., Lander, A. D., Calof, A. L., & Nie, Q. (2009). Feedback regulation in multistage cell lineages. Mathematical biosciences and engineering: MBE, 6(1), 59.
- Lander, A. D., Gokoffski, K. K., Wan, F. Y. M., Nie, Q., & Calof, A. L. (2009). Cell lineages and the logic of proliferative control. PLoS biology, 7(1), e1000015.
- Enciso, G.A., Sütterlin, C., Tan, M. and Wan, F.Y.M. (2022). Stochastic Chlamydia dynamics and optimal spread, Bull. Math. Biol. 83: 24.
