= Charles Joseph Carter =

American stage magician

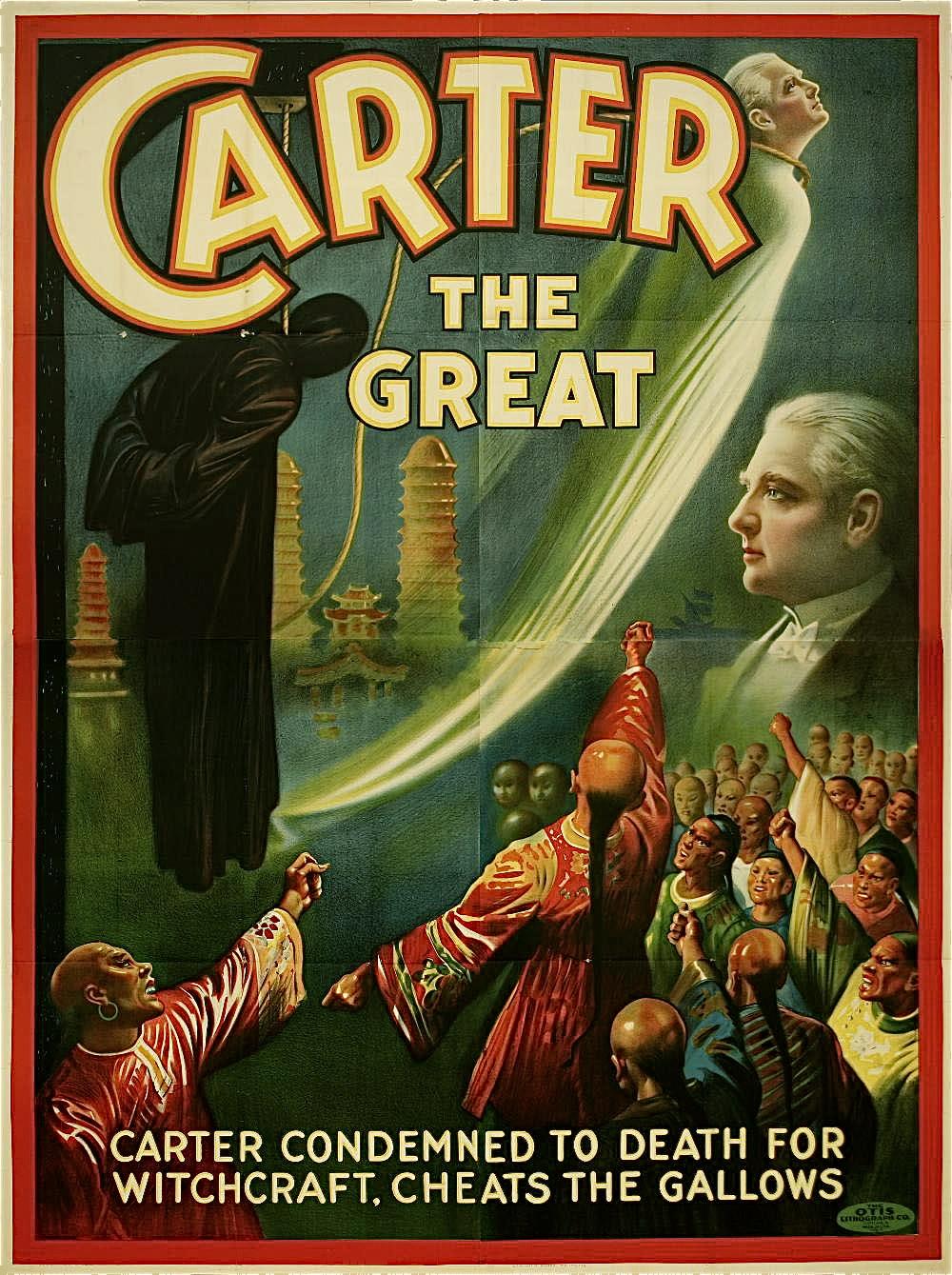
- Born: June 14, 1874; New Castle, Pennsylvania, United States
- Died: February 13, 1936 (aged 61); India
- Occupation: Magician
- Spouse: Corinne

Charles Joseph Carter (June 14, 1874 – February 13, 1936) was an American stage magician, also known as Carter the Great.

== Biography ==
He was born on June 14, 1874, in New Castle, Pennsylvania, and developed an interest in magic from a young age. Carter's first theatrical experience occurred at the Herzog's museum and Pat Harris' Masonic Temple in Baltimore at the age of 10, where he appeared as "Master Charles Carter the Original Boy Magician". Due to stiff competition from the number of magic acts on the American stages at the time, Carter opted to pursue his career abroad, where he gained fame.

Among the highlights of Carter's stage performances during his career were the classic "sawing a woman in half" illusion (an elaborate surgical-themed version with "nurses" in attendance), making a live elephant disappear and "cheating the gallows", where a shrouded Carter would vanish, just as he dropped at the end of a hangman's noose. He was also known for devising acts that were inspired by recent events that captured the public's imagination, such as the discovery of Tutankhamen's tomb in 1922 or John Dillinger's famous jailbreak in 1934.

In 1894 he met his future wife, Corrine, whom he married and included in his show. A year later, his son, Lawrence, who would eventually take over the act after his death, was born.

Around the beginning of the century, Carter decided to settle down in Chicago along with his wife and son, his first major break from touring. During this time he tried to get a series of different business ventures up and running, such as an entertainment agency called The National Theatrical Exchange and his trade magazine called The Chicago Footlights, with various levels of success. During this time, he also enrolled in law school, from which he graduated in 1905.

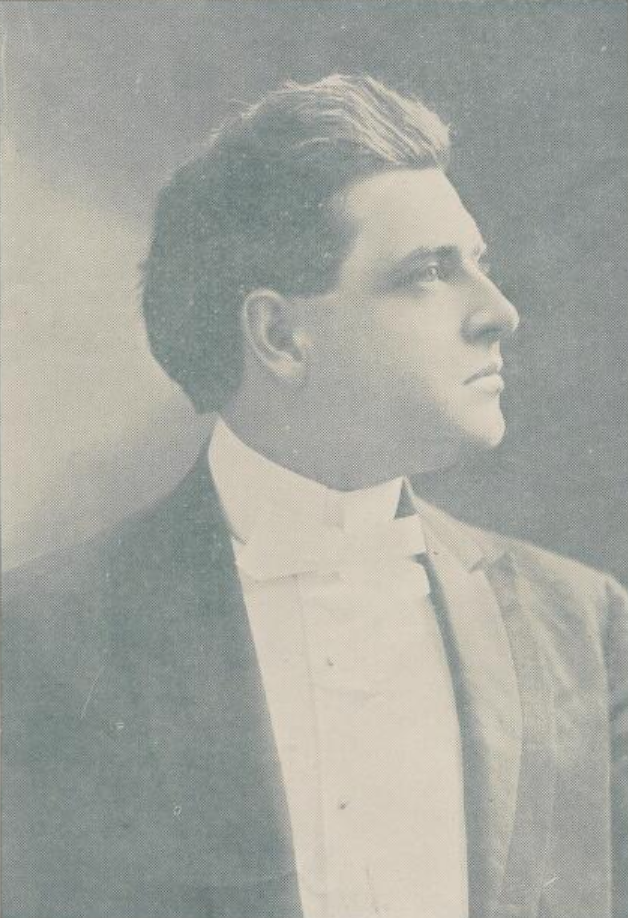
Carter in Australia in 1907

In 1907 he set off again on a world tour that took him and his family to Australia, New Zealand, India, China, Sri Lanka, Egypt, Italy and beyond for three years. He would continue to tour the world with only short respites in the United States until 1917, completing seven world tours in this time. Because of his elaborate live shows, he had to travel everywhere with a lot of equipment, which at one point reached the weight of 31 tons. According to some sources, it was this heavy equipment of his that lead to him being refused a place on the RMS Titanic during a return trip to the US in 1912.

Looking for a break from his world touring magic show, Carter purchased the famous Martinka Magic Palace in 1917. Despite plans of opening Martinka shops all over the country, Carter soon discovered that he was losing money in the magic shop business and sold the Martinka two years later to a group of investors that included Harry Houdini. A famous anecdote states that he kept his lion, Monty, in the back room of the shop and when it would roar, the startled customers would run for the door.

In 1920, The Great Carter was touring again, opening at the Criterion in Sydney, Australia in May, accompanied by stage psychic Miss Evelyn Maxwell. The pair then toured Australia before heading overseas again.

In 1921, he lost a fortune while filming The Lion’s Bride in South Africa, a movie starring himself, that he had also written, produced, directed. The film never made it to screen.

The Great Carter returned to touring, playing packed houses in Australia in 1924 and again in 1934 together with Miss Evelyn Maxwell.

In 1936, Charles Joseph Carter suffered a heart attack on his way to Bombay, India. He was sent to the hospital and his son Larry took over the show. He died on February 13, 1936, aged 61 following a second heart attack. He is buried in the Calvary Cemetery in Queens, New York.

== Legacy ==
Carter's home in San Francisco was rented by the Sumitomo Bank of California in the 1980s–90s and used as a residence for the Bank's president. Carter used to put on shows in the basement and people still discover occult references in the stained glass windows. The house is in the Seacliff District of San Francisco near the Pacific Ocean. It is sometimes mistakenly referred to as the "Houdini Mansion". It is now used as a foreign consulate.

Following Charles Carter's death from a heart attack in 1936, his son Larry Carter took over as Carter the Great.

A variety of vintage posters, advertising his shows, are on display at the House on the Rock in Wisconsin.

It is commonly believed that the character 'Maxwell' from the video game 'Don't Starve' was inspired by Carter because of his connections to magic and his relation to the city of San Francisco, as well that his real name is 'William Carter'.

A highly fictionalized account of his life can be found in Carter Beats the Devil (ISBN 0-7868-8632-3) by Glen David Gold. The rights to the novel were purchased in 2002 by Paramount, with Tom Cruise planning to star and produce, but the film has since been stuck in development hell. Warner Bros. currently hold the rights to a Carter Beats the Devil film.

== Timeline - touring dates ==
1906

- September 15 – 21 : Decatur, Illinois
- September 27 – Oct 3 : Cleveland, Ohio
- October 4 – ? : Cincinnati, Ohio
- October 28 – ? : Holland, Michigan
- November 8 – ? : Chicago Heights, Illinois
- November 19 – ? : Fairmount, Indiana
- November 30 – ? : Tecumseh, Michigan

1907

1912

- December 25 : Terre Haute, Indiana

1917

- March 15 : New York City (Moss' Jefferson Theatre)

== Bibliography ==
- Carter the Great, by Mike Caveney (1995) Magic Words
- Carter Beats the Devil, by Glen David Gold (fictional version of Carter's life)
- "The Carter Scrapbook", by Gary R. Frank and Phil Temple (1992)
