= E. Adamson Hoebel =

American author and teacher (1906–1993)

Edward Adamson Hoebel (1906 – 1993) was an American author and academic. He was a Regents Professor Emeritus of anthropology at the University of Minnesota and president of the American Anthropological Association. His work was in the tradition of legal realism.

== Career ==
A student of Franz Boas, he held a PhD in anthropology from Columbia University. There he also attended the seminars of Karl N. Llewellyn, who taught at the Columbia Law School from 1925 to 1951. Llewellyn (1893–1962) was the most important figure associated with the American Legal Realism of the 1920s and 1930s, which held that the law was indeterminate on the basis of statutes and precedents alone and required study of how disputes are resolved in practice. The "sociological" wing of legal realism championed by Llewellyn held that in American law dispute resolution was strongly influenced by norms such as those in mercantile practice. Llewellyn and Hoebel (1941) went to on to develop a means of determining legal practice from ethnographic description of trouble cases, including mediation and negotiation as well as adjudication. Their "case study method" applied both to social systems with and without formal courts.

Hoebel taught anthropology at New York University from 1929 to 1948, and subsequently at the University of Utah from 1948 to 1954. There he was dean of the University College (Arts and Sciences). He served as a Fulbright professor in anthropology at Oxford and in aw at the Catholic University of Leuven. He retired in 1972 as Regents' Professor of Anthropology at the University of Minnesota after teaching there for 18 years, 15 of them as head of the department. He served as president of the American Ethnological Society and the American Anthropological Association. Hoebel was elected to the American Philosophical Society in 1963.

Between 1933 and 1949, Hoebel studied the legal systems of the Northern Cheyenne, Northern Shoshone, Comanche, and Pueblo people, and the legal system of Pakistan in 1961. He was a close friend and colleague of Max Gluckman, founder of the Manchester School of British social Anthropology. Gluckman, also given to a realist orientation to the study of law, used and further developed Llewellyn that Hoebel's "case study method" of analysis of instances of social interaction to infer rules and assumptions used in trouble cases, and the influence of social norms and conflicts outside the law. The behavioral "case study" approach has been continued and expanded in later anthropological works such as Network Analysis and Ethnographic Problems (2005).

His books include Anthropology: The Study of Man (1949), which was a widely used textbook for decades, and The Cheyennes: Indians of the Great Plains (1961). His works as a co-author include The Cheyenne Way: Conflict and Case Law in Primitive Jurisprudence (1941; 1st author, with legal scholar Llewellyn), and The Comanches: Lords of the South Plains (1952; 2nd author with Texas historian Ernest Wallace).

In 1954, Hoebel contributed his major book on legal anthropology, The Law of Primitive Man: A Study in Comparative Legal Dynamics, on broadening the legal realist tradition to include non-Western nations. In doing so, he concluded with a statement about the need for contributions from the comparative legal realism tradition if progress was to be made toward world governance. Eclipsed by the Cold War, even the legal realist concepts of what constitutes law and government have failed to make an impact on political science and the concept of the state in the contemporary period. Hoebel's defined legality this way: "A social norm is legal if its neglect or infraction is regularly met, in threat or in fact, by the application of physical force by an individual or group possessing the socially recognized privilege of so acting." Because "government without law is limited to the administration of services", one of the implications of the legal realist tradition is that it is not necessarily in the capital city that one must look to define the government of a modern nation but to how the law "will develop its shape in the arena of action," "hammered out as specific issues catalyze action for the trouble case at hand". Hoebel's definition, unlike that of neoconservative thought and its Straussian justification of government deception, holds that to be legal, law must be based on social norms, and norms based on agreements within communities, rather than the dominance of the few.
