= Qing Nie =

Mathematics researcher

- Education: Wuhan University (BS); Ohio State University (PhD)
- Title: Chancellor’s Professor of Mathematics
- Scientific career
- Fields: Mathematics, systems biology
- Workplaces: University of California, Irvine

Qing Nie is a mathematician and systems biology researcher. He is a Chancellor's Professor of Mathematics, Developmental and Cell Biology, and Biomedical Engineering at University of California, Irvine. He is also the director of the Center for Mathematical and Computational Biology and the NSF-Simons Center for Multiscale Cell Fate Research at the university.

Nie has published over 170 research papers in the areas of developmental biology, stem cells, computational single-cell genomics, multiscale modeling, deep learning, fluid mechanics & materials, and scientific computing. He has applied systems biology and data-driven methods to study complex biological systems, focusing on single-cell analysis, regeneration, development, and their applications to diseases.

== Education ==
Nie studied Computational Mathematics at Wuhan University and received his bachelor's degree in 1988. He then moved to the U.S. and completed his Doctoral degree in mathematics from Ohio State University in 1995. He completed his Postdoctoral Fellowship from University of Minnesota and The LE Dickson Instructorship at University of Chicago in 1997 and 1999, respectively.

== Career ==
Nie joined University of California in 1999 as an assistant professor of mathematics. He was promoted to associate professor in 2002 and became a professor of mathematics in 2005. He was a founding faculty member of the Department of Biomedical Engineering.

At University of California, Nie was appointed as director of the Center for Mathematical and Computational Biology in 2005, and director for the Mathematical and Computational Biology PhD Gateway Program (2014–2019). He has been an associate director of the Center for Complex Biological Systems since 2007. Nie is the director of the NSF-Simons Center for Multiscale Cell Fate Research since 2018.

As of 2020, Nie has trained 17 PhD students with degrees in mathematics, Biomedical Engineering, and Mathematical, Computational, Systems Biology. Nie has been co-director of NIH T32 predoctoral training grants on Mathematical, Computational, and Systems Biology since 2007.

== Research ==
Nie has conducted research on computational fluids mechanics, material sciences and scientific computing during his PhD and postdoctoral fellows training and his early faculty career. His research focus shifted mainly computational systems biology since his tenure in 2002. He has applied systems biology and data-driven methods to study complex systems in developmental and cell biology, focusing on single-cell analysis and multiscale modeling of stem cells, regeneration, and development, and their connections with cancers and other diseases. Most of Nie's research has been funded by NSF, NIH and private foundation grants.

== Awards and honors ==
- 2005—2008 - Chancellor's Fellow, University of California
- 2013 - Fellow, American Association for the Advancement of Science
- 2014 - Fellow, American Physical Society
- SIAM Fellow in the 2021 class of fellows, "for research and mentoring contributions spanning applied and computational mathematics and developmental cell biology"
- Fellow of the American Mathematical Society in the 2024 class of fellows.

== Selected articles ==
- L. Zhang, K. Radtke, L. Zheng, T. Schilling, Q. Nie. Noise Drives Sharpening of Gene Expression Boundaries in Zebrafish Hindbrain. Molecular Systems Biology, 8:613, 2012
- J. Lei, S. Levin and Q. Nie. A Mathematical Model of Adult Stem Cells Regeneration with Crosstalk between Genetic and Epigenetic Regulation. Proceeding of National Academy of Sciences, USA, E880-E887, 2014.
- S. Wang, M. Karikomi, A. MacLean, Q. Nie. Cell Lineage and Communication Inference via Optimization for Single-cell Transcriptomics. Nucleic Acids Research, 47 (11), Page e66, 2019
- Jin, S., L. Zhang, Q. Nie. scAI: an unsupervised approach for the integrative analysisof parallel single-cell transcriptomic and epigenomic profiles. Genome Biology, 21(1):25, 2020
- Cang Z and Q. Nie. Inferring spatial and signaling relationships between cells from single cell transcriptomic data. Nature Communications, 11(2084), 2020.
