= Richard James Cote =

American pathologist and academic

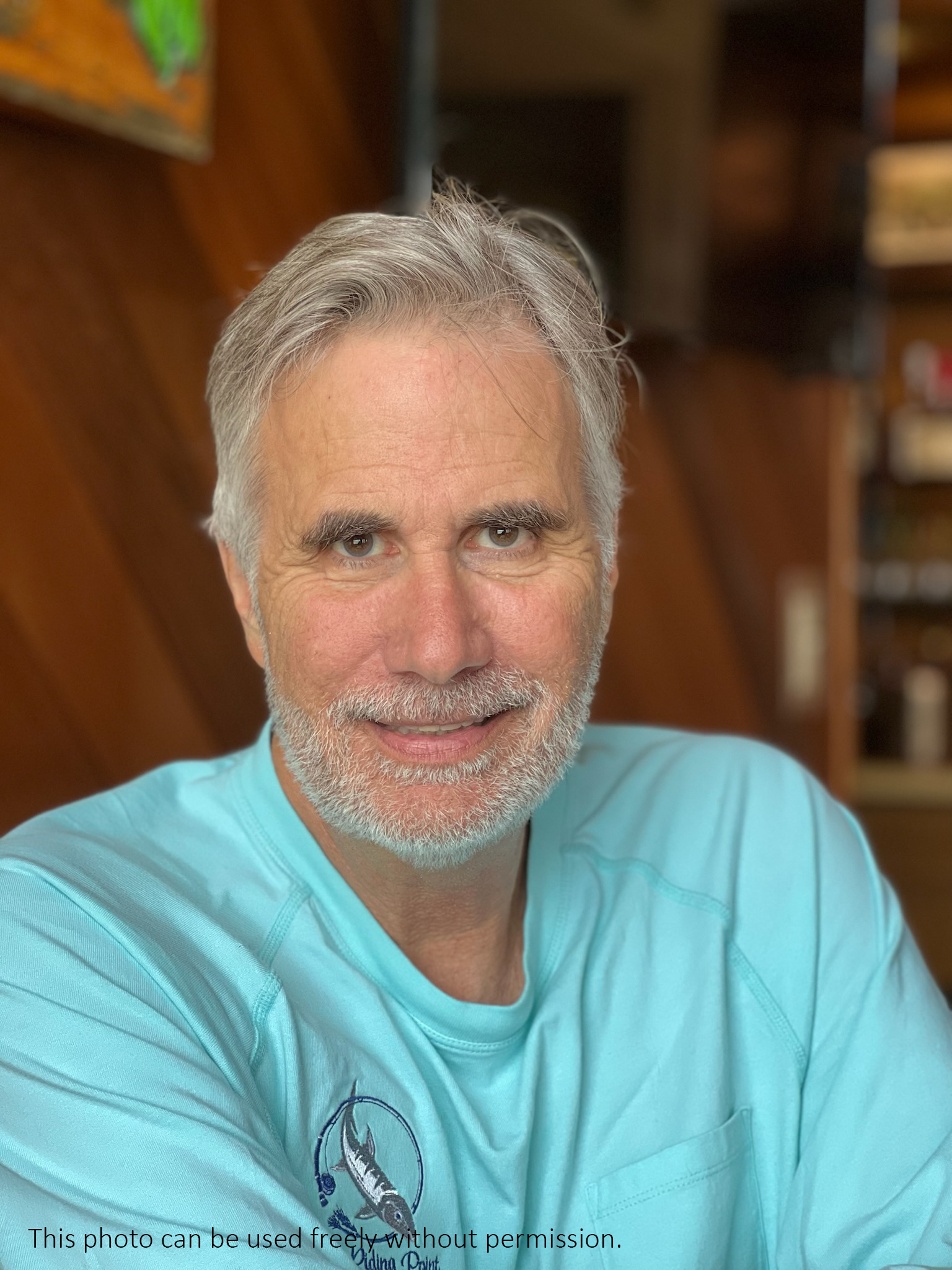
- Education: University of California, Irvine; University of Chicago
- Occupations: Pathologist, academic and author
- Medical career
- Institutions: Washington University in St. Louis; Barnes Jewish Hospital; University of Miami; University of Southern California

Richard James Cote is a pathologist, academic and author. He is the Paul and Ellen Lacy Professor of Pathology in the Department of Pathology and Immunology at Washington University School of Medicine, and the Pathologist-in-Chief at Barnes Jewish Hospital.

Cote's research focuses on the cellular and molecular pathways of tumor progression, metastasis, and therapy response, developing nanoscale technologies for cancer diagnostics, and leading clinical trials in breast, lung, and bladder cancer, resulting in multiple patents. He has published research articles and four books including Immunomicroscopy: A Diagnostic Tool for the Surgical Pathologist and Modern Surgical Pathology. His contributions to the field led him to be listed as a top American doctor by US News, Newsweek Health and Castle Connolly among others. Additionally, he is the recipient of the 2013 Distinguished Alumnus of the Year award from UCI's School of Physical Sciences, the 2015 Miami Chamber of Commerce Bio-Medical Healthcare Heroes Award, and the 2016 Society for Personalized Nano-Medicine Excellence in Service Award.

Cote is a Fellow of the Royal College of Pathologists, the American Board of Pathology, Royal Society of Medicine and the International Society for Urological Pathology, as well as a Senior Member of the National Academy of Inventors, and an elected member of the Association of American Physicians.

== Education and early career ==
Cote earned bachelor's degrees in chemistry and in biology from the University of California, Irvine in 1976. He received his MD degree from the University of Chicago in 1980. He completed a surgical internship at the University of Michigan from 1980 to 1981 and subsequently trained in pathology at New York Hospital-Cornell University Medical College, where he completed a pathology residency from 1985 to 1987.

He undertook research and clinical fellowships at Memorial Sloan Kettering Cancer Center between 1981 and 1990, including research in human tumor immunology with Lloyd Old and a clinical fellowship in surgical pathology. He also completed a postdoctoral fellowship in molecular pathology at New York University.

== Career ==
Cote joined the faculty of the Keck School of Medicine of USC in 1990 as an assistant professor of pathology. He subsequently held appointments in pathology and urology, becoming an associate professor in 1995 and a professor in 1999. At the USC Norris Comprehensive Cancer Center, he served as an attending pathologist and directed programs in immuno- and molecular pathology and genitourinary cancer. He also led the USC Biomedical Nanoscience Initiative from 2005 to 2009.

In 2009, Cote joined the University of Miami Miller School of Medicine as professor and chair of pathology. He also held the Joseph R. Coulter Jr. Chair in Pathology and founded and was the first director of the Dr. John T. Macdonald Foundation Biomedical Nanotechnology Institute. At the University of Miami's Sylvester Comprehensive Cancer Center, he directed the Genitourinary Cancer Program.

Cote was named head of the Department of Pathology and Immunology at Washington University School of Medicine in 2019, succeeding Charles Eby, and began the position on May 1 of that year. He served as department chair from 2019 until 2025. He remains a member of the Washington University faculty as the Paul and Ellen Lacy Professor of Pathology and Immunology.

Cote has also held clinical leadership positions at Jackson Memorial Hospital and Barnes-Jewish Hospital. He has served as Pathologist-in-Chief at Barnes-Jewish Hospital and maintains clinical interests in breast and genitourinary pathology.

In 2023, Cote was appointed a faculty co-director of the Cordell Institute for Policy in Medicine and Law at Washington University. The institute a joint venture of the schools of medicine and law, is a first-of-its-kind collaboration established to examine issues at the intersection of medicine, technology, law, data, and policy.

=== Entrepreneurship and technology development ===
Cote has been involved in the development and commercialization of technologies for cancer diagnosis. He founded or co-founded companies including Impath, Clarient, Filtini, Sensitini, and Circulogix.

Impath was founded in 1988 and focused on cancer diagnostics and was acquired by Genzyme. Cote later founded Clarient, a company that developed diagnostic technologies for pathologists and oncologists; Clarient was acquired by General Electric in 2009.

Circulogix, founded in 2014 by Cote, Ram Datar, and Anthony Williams, commercializes instruments based on parylene membrane microfilter technology developed by Cote and his team for the capture of circulating tumor cells.

Cote and his teams have been awarded over 20 patents in the areas of monoclonal antibodies, cancer biomarkers, digital microscopy, nanotechnology and AI applications to digital microscopy.

== Research ==
Cote's research has examined the cellular and molecular mechanisms underlying tumor progression, metastatic spread, and response to cancer therapy. He is a founder of the field of liquid biopsy, including the study of occult and disseminated tumor cells, and circulating tumor cells. His work includes the development of novel cancer biomarkers, molecular pathology, and nanoscale diagnostic technologies. He has pioneered the application of Artificial Intelligence (AI) in pathology.

=== Cancer diagnosis and circulating tumor cells ===
Cote's early research investigated the detection of occult tumor cells in patients with breast cancer. In a 1988 study, he and colleagues used monoclonal antibodies to detect occult breast carcinoma metastases in bone marrow from patients with early-stage disease. He subsequently showed that the presence and number of occult tumor cells predicted the development of clinical metastasis in these patients.

Cote contributed to research on occult lymph-node metastases in breast cancer. A multicenter study published in The Lancet examined the prognostic significance of immunohistochemically detected lymph-node metastases in patients with breast cancer. Later research found that many early disseminated cancer cells in the bone marrow of breast cancer patients displayed characteristics associated with breast cancer stem cells.

His research later expanded to the isolation and characterization of circulating tumor cells (CTCs). Cote and colleagues developed a portable filter-based microdevice using a parylene membrane for size-based isolation, enrichment and characterization of CTCs from peripheral blood. Related work explored microfilter systems for viable CTC enrichment and subsequent characterization. Using this device, Cote and his team were the first to show that cells of the primary tumor microenvironment (TME), in particular cancer associated fibroblasts, are often found in circulation with CTC, and when found predicted a worse prognosis.

Cote has also co-edited works on circulating tumor cells and liquid biopsy, including Circulating Tumor Cells: Advances in Basic Science and Clinical Applications and Circulating Tumor Cells: Advances in Liquid Biopsy Technologies.

=== Molecular pathology, cancer biomarkers and nanotechnology ===
Cote's research in bladder cancer has included studies of molecular alterations associated with tumor progression. In a 1994 _New England Journal of Medicine_ study, he and colleagues reported that accumulation of nuclear p53 was associated with tumor progression and prognosis in bladder cancer. This team later showed that that adjuvant cisplatin-based chemotherapy after radical cystectomy improves survival in muscle-invasive bladder cancer patients with p53 alterations. Other work investigated molecular differences between papillary and nonpapillary pathways of transitional cell carcinoma of the bladder.

He also participated in the development of nanoscale biosensing technologies. A 2001 study demonstrated the use of microcantilevers to detect prostate-specific antigen (PSA), providing a potential platform for biomarker detection. In collaboration with scientists at the University of Southern California, he developed a series of nanosensing nanoribbons capable of detecting clinically relevant levels of circulating protein biomarkers, and more recently have shown the ultrasensitive detection of miRNA species associated with various cancers.

Cote was also a co-author of guidelines for human epidermal growth factor receptor 2 (HER2) testing in breast cancer, which recommended standardized testing procedures and interpretation criteria for improving the reliability of HER2 assessment.

Cote also helped develop antigen retrieval in immunohistochemistry with Shan-Rong Shi and Clive R. Taylor, examining methods used to improve immunohistochemical staining of tissue specimens.

=== Cancer treatment and clinical trials ===
Cote has participated in clinical research concerning the treatment and prognosis of genitourinary cancers. A large study of 1,054 patients evaluated long-term outcomes after radical cystectomy for invasive bladder cancer and examined the prognostic significance of tumor stage and lymph-node status.

He has also contributed to systematic reviews and analyses of adjuvant chemotherapy following radical cystectomy for muscle-invasive bladder cancer. A 2014 meta-analysis examined randomized trials of adjuvant chemotherapy, while a 2022 individual-participant-data meta-analysis evaluated outcomes associated with cisplatin-based adjuvant chemotherapy.

=== Digital pathology and artificial intelligence ===
Cote's later research has included digital pathology, computational microscopy, and artificial intelligence. He collaborated with researchers at the California Institute of Technology on methods for producing all-in-focus digital images of cytological specimens using Fourier ptychographic microscopy.

In 2023, Cote and colleagues reported a deep-learning approach for the automatic detection of circulating tumor cells and cancer-associated fibroblasts captured using microfilter technology. The study combined an imaging system designed to produce highly focused images with machine-learning methods for cell identification.

In 2024, Cote and colleagues reported an artificial-intelligence method using histopathological features to predict brain metastasis in patients with lung cancer. His team went on to show how AI learns on digital images and that color variation in histologic sections is the primary reason that AI algorithms cannot be easily generalized.

In 2026, Cote co-authored a review of artificial intelligence and digital pathology that discussed clinical applications of AI in cancer diagnosis and assessment, including whole-slide imaging, quantitative analysis, and integration of pathological and clinical data.

== Awards and honors ==
- 2010 – Elected Member, Association of American Physicians
- 2013 – Distinguished Alumnus of the Year, University of California, Irvine
- 2015 – Bio-Medical Healthcare Heroes Award, Miami Chamber of Commerce
- 2016 – Excellence in Service Award, Society for Personalized Nano-Medicine
- 2021 – Senior Member, National Academy of Inventors
- 2024 – Fellow, Royal Society of Medicine

Cote is a Fellow of the Royal College of Pathologists and the College of American Pathologists and holds the professional designations FRCPath and FCAP. He was elected to the Association of American Physicians in 2010 and, based on his multiple patents and innovations, was elected a Senior Member of the National Academy of Inventors in 2021.

== Bibliography ==
=== Books ===
- Immunomicroscopy: A Diagnostic Tool for the Surgical Pathologist (1994) ISBN 978-0721664620
- Modern Surgical Pathology (2003) ISBN 978-0721672533
- Circulating Tumor Cells, Advances in Basic Science and Clinical Applications (2016) ISBN 978-1493933617
- Circulating Tumor Cells, Advances in Liquid Biopsy Technologies (2023) ISBN 978-3031229022

=== Selected articles ===
- Cote, Richard J.; Rosen, Paul P.; Hakes, Thomas B.; Sedira, Mohamed; Bazinet, Michel; Kinne, David W.; Old, Lloyd J.; Osborne, Michael P. (May 1988). "Monoclonal Antibodies Detect Occult Breast Carcinoma Metastases in the Bone Marrow of Patients with Early Stage Disease". The American Journal of Surgical Pathology. 12 (5): 333–340. doi:10.1097/00000478-198805000-00001. ISSN 0147-5185. PMID 3364618.
- Cote, R J; Rosen, P P; Lesser, M L; Old, L J; Osborne, M P (1991). "Prediction of early relapse in patients with operable breast cancer by detection of occult bone marrow micrometastases". Journal of Clinical Oncology. 9 (10): 1749–1756. doi:10.1200/JCO.1991.9.10.1749. ISSN 0732-183X. PMID 1919627.
- Shi, Shan-Rong; Cote, Richard J.; Taylor, Clive R. (1997). "Antigen Retrieval Immunohistochemistry: Past, Present, and Future". Journal of Histochemistry & Cytochemistry. 45 (3): 327–343. doi:10.1177/002215549704500301. ISSN 0022-1554. PMID 9071315.
- Esrig, D., Elmajian, D., Groshen, S., Freeman, J. A., Stein, J. P., Chen, S. C., ... & Cote, R. J. (1994). Accumulation of nuclear p53 and tumor progression in bladder cancer. New England Journal of Medicine, 331(19), 1259-1264.
- Cote, Rj; Fpeterson, H; Chaiwun, B; Gelber, Rd; Goldhirsch, A; Castiglione-Gertsch, M; Gusterson, B; Neville, Am (1999). "Role of immunohistochemical detection of lymph-node metastases in management of breast cancer". The Lancet. 354 (9182): 896–900. doi:10.1016/S0140-6736(98)11104-2. PMID 10489948.
- Stein, J. P., Lieskovsky, G., Cote, R., Groshen, S., Feng, A. C., Boyd, S., ... & Skinner, D. G. (2001). Radical cystectomy in the treatment of invasive bladder cancer: long-term results in 1,054 patients. Journal of clinical oncology, 19(3), 666-675.
- Wu, G., Datar, R. H., Hansen, K. M., Thundat, T., Cote, R. J., & Majumdar, A. (2001). Bioassay of prostate-specific antigen (PSA) using microcantilevers. Nature biotechnology, 19(9), 856-860.
- Wolff, A. C., Hammond, M. E. H., Schwartz, J. N., Hagerty, K. L., Allred, D. C., Cote, R. J., ... & Hayes, D. F. (2006). American Society of Clinical Oncology/College of American Pathologists guideline recommendations for human epidermal growth factor receptor 2 testing in breast cancer. Journal of clinical oncology, 25(1), 118-145.
- Zhou, H., Watson, M., Bernadt, C. T., Lin, S., Lin, C. Y., Ritter, J. H., ... & Cote, R. J. (2024). AI‐guided histopathology predicts brain metastasis in lung cancer patients. The Journal of Pathology, 263(1), 89-98.
