= Cameron Carter =

American psychiatrist

- Education: University of Western Australia
- Occupation: Psychiatrist

Cameron Carter is an American psychiatrist. He is a distinguished professor in the department of psychiatry at the University of California, Irvine.

In 2025, Carter was elected as a member of the National Academy of Medicine.
