= Wright Massey =

American businessman

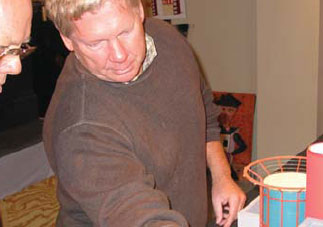
- Wright Massey in Orlando on April 1, 2007
- Born: June 21, 1953 (age 72); Elizabeth City, North Carolina, North Carolina, US
- Occupations: CEO, Brand Architecture Inc.
- Website: Brand Architecture

Wright Massey (born June 21, 1953) is an American businessman and entrepreneur most widely known as the vice president of development of Starbucks, the director of design at The Disney Store, and designer of the famous Coca-Cola sign in Times Square. Wright Massey founded Brand Architecture, Inc.

In 1994, he joined Seattle's Starbucks to redesign its stores. He is credited with creating the Synergistic Rollout Program that built one store per day, saving Starbucks $20M annually. Massey also established the Creative Services Group which produced the brand identity and the store design. Massey created a visual brand language for Starbucks that was recognizable and distinctive, the way Coca-Cola maintained the color red, Spencerian script, and the red bottle for over 100 years. The visual brand language consisted of icons, stories, and color palettes that conveyed the look and feel of Starbucks graphics.

Massey's Synergistic Rollout Program helped aggressively expand Starbucks' reach across the United States. In Schultz's co-authored book called Pour Your Heart into It, Schultz states about Massey: "Given the apparently contradictory tasks of lowering costs while creating a better design, Wright's team not only accomplished that but also a third: devising novel formats that would allow sales in locations we never could have considered before."
