= Jean-Luc Gaudiot =

Professor at UC Irvine

Jean-Luc Gaudiot is a professor at the Henry Samueli School of Engineering at the University of California, Irvine.

== Education ==
In 1977, he earned his M.S. at the University of California, Los Angeles and his Ph.D. there in 1982.

== Career ==
He served as the Editor-in-Chief on the IEEE Transactions on Computers from 1999 to 2000 until becoming the co-founder and founding Editor-in-Chief of IEEE Computer Architecture Letters from 2006 to 2009. From 2010 to 2015, he served as a member of the IEEE Computer Society Board of Governors. In 2013, he served as the Vice President of the IEEE Computer Society and Chair of Educational Activities Board. From 2014 and 2015, he served as the Vice President of the IEEE Computer Society and Chair of Publication Board and, in 2016, he served as the President-Elect of the IEEE Computer Society and, in 2017, he began serving as the President of the IEEE Computer Society.

== Research ==
His interests are in computer architecture, information, communication and design and is one of the authors of Creating Autonomous Vehicle Systems, a technical overview of autonomous vehicles written for a general computing and engineering audience. He is an elected IEEE fellow and a distinguished alumni at ESIEE Paris.
