= Sunnyside (novel) =

2009 novel by Glen David Gold

- First edition
- Author: Glen David Gold
- Language: English
- Genre: Historical Fiction
- Publisher: Alfred A. Knopf
- Publication date: May 5, 2009
- Publication place: United States
- Media type: Print (hardback, paperback)
- Pages: 576 (Hardback, 2009)
- ISBN: 978-0-307-27068-9
- OCLC: 251203725
- Dewey Decimal: 813/.6 22
- LC Class: PS3607.O43 S86 2009

Sunnyside is a historical novel by Glen David Gold.

== Synopsis ==
The novel is about Charlie Chaplin and the rise of Hollywood and celebrity during 1918.
