= David Schlaepfer =

American biologist

David Schlaepfer is a California-born scientist known for his studies on cell migration and cancer metastasis. His early research focused on signaling by protein kinases, with a subsequent focus on the proteins that regulate the turnover of cell contacts with the extracellular matrix. In particular, Schlaepfer is well known for his studies on focal adhesion kinase (FAK).

== Education and works ==
Schlaepfer received his PhD in Biological Sciences after training in the laboratory of Harry Haigler at the University of California, Irvine in 1992, with early work focused on the function and regulation of protein kinase C (PKC). Schlaepfer then moved to the Salk Institute to train with Tony Hunter, a pioneer in the study of protein-tyrosine phosphorylation, where his work focused on FAK. In 1995, Schlaepfer won the Santa Cruz Biotechnology investigator award. By 1996, Schlaepfer was awarded a position as an assistant professor at The Scripps Research Institute in La Jolla, where he advanced to the associate professor level. In 2007, Schlaepfer joined the Department of Reproductive Medicine in the School of Medicine at the University of California, San Diego as a full professor.

As of 2021, Schlaepfer is a professor in the Department of Obstetrics, Gynecology and Reproductive Science in the School of Medicine at the University of California, San Diego.

== Key publications ==
- Schlaepfer, David D.; Hanks, Steven K.; Hunter, Tony; Geer, Peter van der (1994). "Integrin-mediated signal transduction linked to Ras pathway by GRB2 binding to focal adhesion kinase". Nature. 372 (6508). Springer Science and Business Media LLC: 786–791. Bibcode:1994Natur.372..786S. doi:10.1038/372786a0. ISSN 0028-0836. PMID 7997267. S2CID 4346113.
- Ilić, Duško; Almeida, Eduardo A.C.; Schlaepfer, David D.; Dazin, Paul; Aizawa, Shinichi; Damsky, Caroline H. (October 19, 1998). "Extracellular Matrix Survival Signals Transduced by Focal Adhesion Kinase Suppress p53-mediated Apoptosis". Journal of Cell Biology. 143 (2). Rockefeller University Press: 547–560. doi:10.1083/jcb.143.2.547. ISSN 0021-9525. PMC 2132850. PMID 9786962.
- Sieg, David J.; Hauck, Christof R.; Ilic, Dusko; Klingbeil, Candice K.; Schaefer, Erik; Damsky, Caroline H.; Schlaepfer, David D. (March 27, 2000). "FAK integrates growth-factor and integrin signals to promote cell migration". Nature Cell Biology. 2 (5). Springer Science and Business Media LLC: 249–256. doi:10.1038/35010517. ISSN 1465-7392. PMID 10806474. S2CID 7102625.
- Hauck, C. R. (December 1, 2002). "FRNK blocks v-Src-stimulated invasion and experimental metastases without effects on cell motility or growth". The EMBO Journal. 21 (23). Wiley: 6289–6302. doi:10.1093/emboj/cdf631. ISSN 1460-2075. PMC 136935. PMID 12456636.
- Hsia, Datsun A.; Mitra, Satyajit K.; Hauck, Christof R.; Streblow, Daniel N.; Nelson, Jay A.; Ilic, Dusko; Huang, Shuang; Li, Erguang; Nemerow, Glen R.; Leng, Jay; Spencer, Kathryn S.R.; Cheresh, David A.; Schlaepfer, David D. (March 3, 2003). "Differential regulation of cell motility and invasion by FAK". Journal of Cell Biology. 160 (5). Rockefeller University Press: 753–767. doi:10.1083/jcb.200212114. ISSN 1540-8140. PMC 2173366. PMID 12615911.
- Hsia, Datsun A.; Lim, Ssang-Taek; Bernard-Trifilo, Joie A.; Mitra, Satyajit K.; Tanaka, Sakae; den Hertog, Jeroen; Streblow, Daniel N.; Ilic, Dusko; Ginsberg, Mark H.; Schlaepfer, David D. (2005). "Integrin α4β1 Promotes Focal Adhesion Kinase-Independent Cell Motility via α4 Cytoplasmic Domain-Specific Activation of c-Src". Molecular and Cellular Biology. 25 (21). American Society for Microbiology: 9700–9712. doi:10.1128/mcb.25.21.9700-9712.2005. ISSN 0270-7306. PMC 1265817. PMID 16227616.
- Mitra, S K; Mikolon, D; Molina, J E; Hsia, D A; Hanson, D A; Chi, A; Lim, S-T; Bernard-Trifilo, J A; Ilic, D; Stupack, D G; Cheresh, D A; Schlaepfer, D D (May 8, 2006). "Intrinsic FAK activity and Y925 phosphorylation facilitate an angiogenic switch in tumors". Oncogene. 25 (44). Springer Science and Business Media LLC: 5969–5984. doi:10.1038/sj.onc.1209588. ISSN 0950-9232. PMID 16682956. S2CID 25367061.
- Lim, Yangmi; Lim, Ssang-Taek; Tomar, Alok; Gardel, Margaret; Bernard-Trifilo, Joie A.; Chen, Xiao Lei; Uryu, Sean A.; Canete-Soler, Rafaela; Zhai, Jinbin; Lin, Hong; Schlaepfer, William W.; Nalbant, Perihan; Bokoch, Gary; Ilic, Dusko; Waterman-Storer, Clare; Schlaepfer, David D. (January 14, 2008). "PyK2 and FAK connections to p190Rho guanine nucleotide exchange factor regulate RhoA activity, focal adhesion formation, and cell motility". Journal of Cell Biology. 180 (1). Rockefeller University Press: 187–203. doi:10.1083/jcb.200708194. ISSN 1540-8140. PMC 2213606. PMID 18195107.
- Wu, L; Bernard-Trifilo, J A; Lim, Y; Lim, S-T; Mitra, S K; Uryu, S; Chen, M; Pallen, C J; Cheung, N-Kv; Mikolon, D; Mielgo, A; Stupack, D G; Schlaepfer, D D (September 10, 2007). "Distinct FAK-Src activation events promote α5β1 and α4β1 integrin-stimulated neuroblastoma cell motility". Oncogene. 27 (10). Springer Science and Business Media LLC: 1439–1448. doi:10.1038/sj.onc.1210770. ISSN 0950-9232. PMC 2593630. PMID 17828307.
