= Michael Dennin =

American physicist

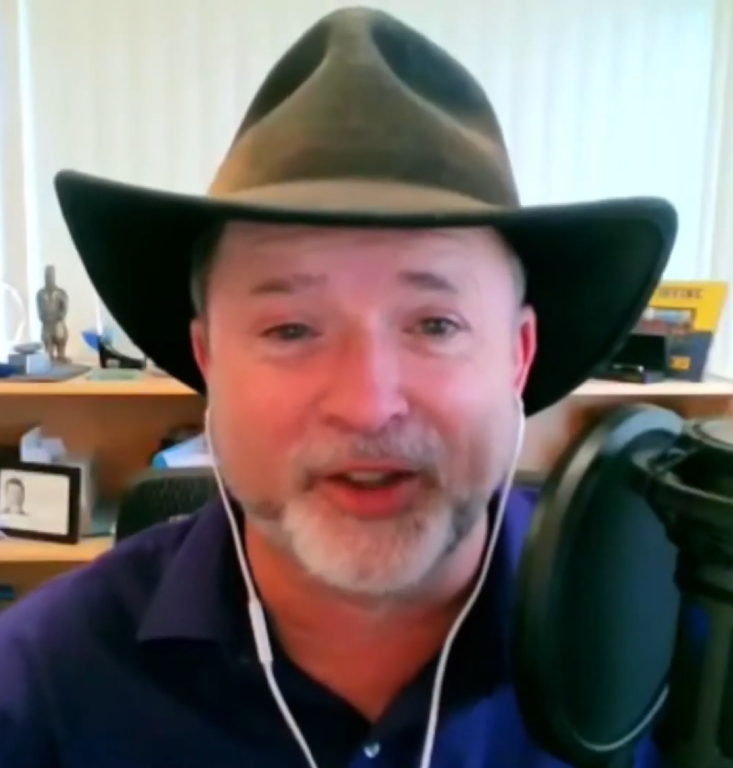
- Dennin in 2021
- Education: Princeton University; University of California, Santa Barbara
- Occupation: Physicist
- Website: www.denninmichael.com

Michael Dennin is an American physicist. He is a professor in the department of physics and astronomy at the University of California, Irvine.

In 2021, Dennin was named a fellow of the American Physical Society, "for positively impacting educational policy at the national, state, and campus levels, and for work as an ambassador for physics through outstanding communication and popularization of the ideas and applicability of physics in numerous public forums, and through extensive media appearances".
