= Structural cohesion =

Lowest number of people removed to disconnect a social group

In sociology, structural cohesion is the conception of a useful formal definition and measure of cohesion in social groups. It is defined as the minimal number of actors in a social network that need to be removed to disconnect the group. It is thus identical to the question of the node connectivity of a given graph in discrete mathematics. The vertex-cut version of Menger's theorem also proves that the disconnection number is equivalent to a maximally sized group with a network in which every pair of persons has at least this number of separate paths between them. It is also useful to know that k-cohesive graphs (or k-components) are always a subgraph of a k-core, although a k-core is not always k-cohesive. A k-core is simply a subgraph in which all nodes have at least k neighbors but it need not even be connected.

The boundaries of structural endogamy in a kinship group are a special case of structural cohesion.

== Software ==
Cohesive.blocking is the R program for computing structural cohesion according to the Moody-White (2003) algorithm. This wiki site provides numerous examples and a tutorial for use with R.

== Examples ==
Some illustrative examples are presented in the gallery below:

The 6-node ring in the graph has connectivity-2 or a level 2 of structural cohesion because the removal of two nodes is needed to disconnect it.

The 6-node component (1-connected) has an embedded 2-component, nodes 1-5

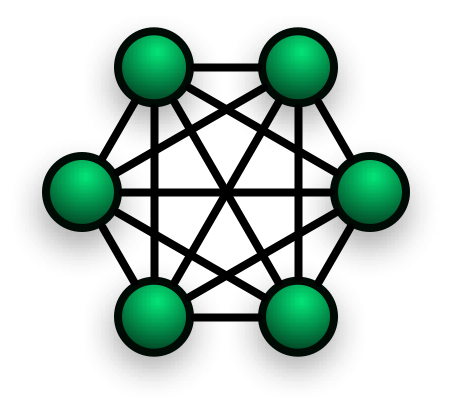
A 6-node clique is a 5-component, structural cohesion 5

== Perceived cohesion ==
Perceived Cohesion Scale (PCS) is a six item scale that is used to measure structural cohesion in groups. In 1990, Bollen and Hoyle used the PCS and applied it to a study of large groups which were used to assess the psychometric qualities of their scale.

== See also ==
- Community cohesion
- Social cohesion
- Social network
