= James D. Herbert (art historian) =

American art historian

James D. Hebert
- Born: 1959 (age 66–67); United States
- Occupations: Art historian, educator

James D. Herbert (born 1959) is an American art historian. He is professor in the Art History department at the University of California Irvine.

== Early life and education ==
Herbert grew up in Eugene, Oregon and is the son of an architect and art teacher.

== Career ==
After receiving his Ph.D. from Yale University, Herbert became a part of the staff at Yale before moving on to the University of Southern California and finally to the University of California Irvine. He originally studied French paintings ranging from the late 19th century to early 20th century, but has widened his topics of interest to include other European Art. Besides studying painting, he also studies architecture, sculpture, gardens, and musicology. He describes his approach to art as one that "has ranged from the social history of depicted motifs, to the close semiotic analysis of pictorial details, to the comparative study of art and non-art objects in the manner of visual studies."

He has published many articles and books including Our Distance from God and Fauve Painting which was the co-winner of the 1993 Hans Rosenhaupt Memorial Book Award given by the Woodrow Wilson National Fellowship Foundation.

While teaching at the University of California Irvine, he received the Division of Undergraduate Education for Instructional Technology Innovation Award and the Teaching Excellence Award in 2007 from the School of Humanities for his groundbreaking use of the program Keynote for Macintosh computers.

== Selected publications ==
- "The Political Origins of Abstract Expressionist Art Criticism". Telos. 62. New York: Telos Press. Winter 1984–85.
