= Tessie Wall =

Madam who operated brothels in San Francisco, California

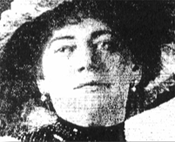
- Photograph of Tessie Wall
- Born: Teresa Susan Donohue; May 1869; San Francisco, California
- Died: April 1932 (aged 62); San Francisco, California
- Occupation: Madam
- Known for: Proprietor of brothels in San Francisco
- Spouses: Mr. Wall; Frank Daroux
- Children: one son

Teresa Susan Donohue (May 1869 – April 1932), better known as Tessie Wall, was an American madam who owned and operated brothels in San Francisco, California, from 1898 to 1917. She was married to gambler and political boss Frank Daroux, whom she attempted to kill in 1917 as he sought to divorce her. In the 1920s she was the unofficial "queen" of the annual policeman's balls that were held at the Civic Auditorium. She was the most successful madam in San Francisco in the early 20th century.

== Origins ==
Donohue was born in San Francisco, California into a working-class Irish Catholic family that lived south of Market Street. She was described as having been blonde-haired with blue eyes. In the early 1890s, her first husband Mr. Wall, who worked as a fireman, died and she was left to support herself and small son. She entered the household of wealthy banker Judah Boas as a domestic servant.

== Madam ==
It is not known when she left the Boas household, but at some stage she became a dance hall girl and had earned the reputation of being a hard drinker. She allegedly outdrank boxer John L. Sullivan. In 1898, she opened her first brothel – ostensibly a "boarding-house" – at 211 O'Farrell Street in the Tenderloin district, according to 1900 US Census, San Francisco, district 257. In 1906, after the devastating fire which followed the 1906 San Francisco earthquake had destroyed her first brothel, she opened her second establishment on the same street at 337 O'Farrell (the current site of the San Francisco Hilton hotel). In the same year, she married Frank Daroux, a political boss who also owned pool halls and gambling dens in the city.

Wall was fond of horse racing and collecting antiques. She owned an elegant townhouse on Powell Street.

In 1917, after her husband sued her for divorce, Wall attempted to kill him by shooting him several times with her revolver. Daroux survived and declined to press charges against Wall.

From the 1920s until her death in April 1932, Wall was the unofficial "queen" of the annual San Francisco policeman's balls, and it became her custom to lead the Grand March in the Civic Auditorium. On one such occasion Mayor Sunny Jim Rolfe was her escort. Her last public appearance was at a policeman's ball in 1932, a month before her death. She was described as having worn a blonde wig, white satin gown, and part of her collection of diamond jewelry.
