= Structural endogamy =

Turkish nomad clan visualized with the nodes as marriages, upward links to parents: all pairs of nodes are multiply connected through relinking marriages that create the boundaries of structural endogamy

Structural endogamy is a network concept that provides a means of finding the boundaries of endogamy in a community, using simply the genealogical and marriage linkages. The concept is related to that of structural cohesion. The examples are made with free tool Pajek. Another name for structural endogamy is (marital) relinking, which comes out of French social anthropology, and the study of how communities are formed through couples marrying who are already linked: linked, that is, by chains of kinship and marriage, as in circles of intermarrying families, or marriages between people with one or more ancestors in common (i.e., blood relatives, such as cousins). Many of the marriages represented in the Turkish nomads figure are with cousins, for example. But relinking also occurs without blood marriages, as in the example from the Mexican village of Belén Atzitzi-mititlán within Apetatitlán de Antonio Carvajal.

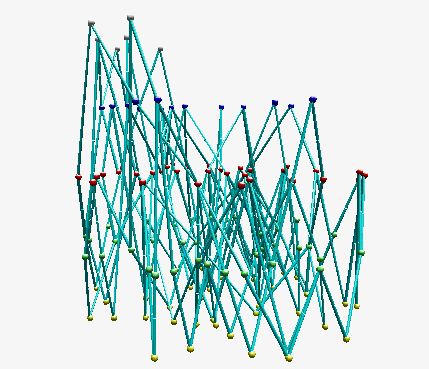
Village of Belen, Mexico, visualized with the nodes as marriages, upward links to parents: all pairs of nodes are multiply connected through relinking marriages that create the boundaries of structural endogamy. Marriages with blood kin are forbidden (e.g., up to third cousins) but a core of the villagers relink.
