= Santa Cruz Biotechnology =

American biotechnology company

Santa Cruz Biotechnology, Inc. (SCBT) is a developer of biological products for medical research, and is one of the world's largest suppliers of antibodies. Santa Cruz Biotechnology headquarters is located in Dallas, Texas, with additional US facilities in Paso Robles, California, and Sun Valley, Idaho. The company also has international locations in Germany, Shanghai, and Canada. It is focused on the production of research tools and reagents, which also include biochemicals, labware, and CRISPR products.

== History ==
SCBT was founded in 1991 by Dr. John Stephenson and his wife Brenda Stephenson in Santa Cruz, California. The company was originally headquartered in Santa Cruz, California, where the Stephensons acquired vast tracts of land, and began offering antibodies to the research community. Other products lines were added over the years – siRNAs in 2007, shRNAs in 2009, and laboratory supplies in 2010.

In 2010, the offering of biochemical items was expanded from just a few hundred to over 100,000 different products. Products related to CRISPR were introduced in 2015 including over 37,000 mouse and human genes.

Santa Cruz Biotechnology has had issues with the USDA for a number of years due to allegations of Animal Welfare Act violations. Three animal welfare complaints were lodged after inspectors found evidence of animal mistreatment at the company's facility in California. In May 2016, the company settled with the USDA, paying a $3.5 million fine for its alleged violations and agreed to the revocation of its polyclonal antibody dealer license effective from December 31, 2016. The fine is considered the largest in the USDA's history.
