= Coercion, Capital, and European States, AD 990–1992 =

Book by Charles Tilly

Coercion, Capital, and European States
- Cover of the 1993 paperback edition
- Author: Charles Tilly
- Language: English
- Genre: State formation
- Published: 1992
- Publisher: Basil Blackwell
- Publication place: United Kingdom; United States
- Media type: Print (hardcover and paperback)
- Pages: 269
- ISBN: 1-55786-368-7

Coercion, Capital, and European States, AD 990–1992 is a 1992 book by the American political scientist Charles Tilly.

The central theme of the book is state formation. Tilly writes about the complex history of European state formation from the Middle Ages to the early 1990s – a thousand-year time span. While examining political, social, and technological change, Tilly attempts to explain the unprecedented success of the European nation-state as the dominant polity in the world, claiming that "the origins of the modern European state lay in war and preparations for war."

== Overview ==
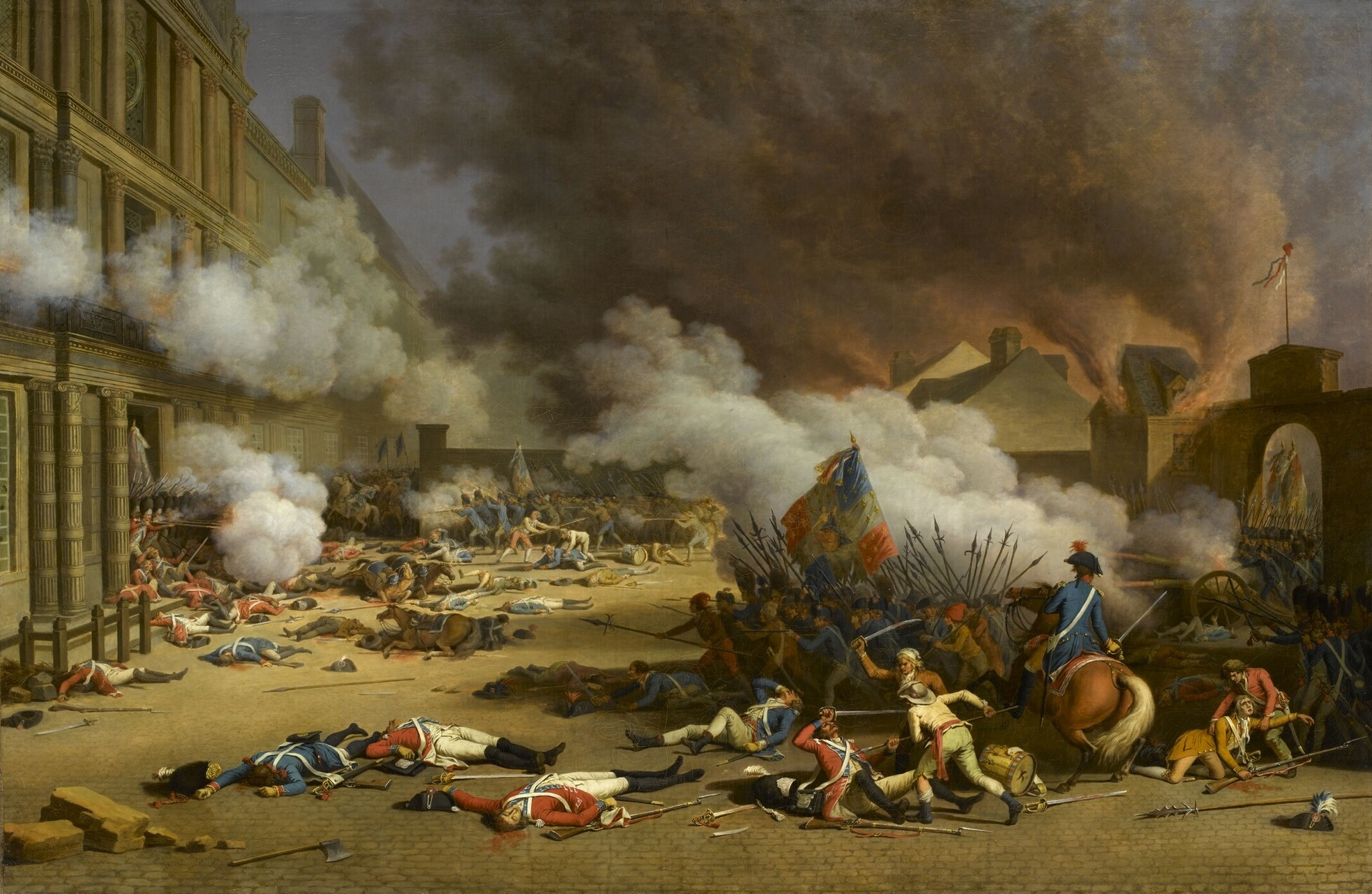
According to Tilly, the French Revolution unfolded from protests against the high taxes the French rulers imposed to balance for the expensive American War.

Tilly asks a double question in Coercion, Capital, and European States, namely: "What accounts for the great variation over time and space in the kinds of states that have prevailed in Europe since AD 990, and why did European states eventually converge on different variants of the national state?"

According to Tilly's theory, military innovation in pre-modern Europe, especially the use of gunpowder and mass armies, made war considerably more expensive. In order to continue to fund warfare, conquest, and security, only states with sufficient capital and a large population could afford paying for their security and ultimately surviving in a hostile environment. Those in power were forced to develop a means of extraction by, for example, introducing taxation and conscription. Subsequently, these means of extraction resulted in the creation of state bureaucracies and a centralized state.

The type of state that develops is dependent on the structure of the area. In areas where merchants and capital were the predominant class, city states arose, such as Venice. In areas where independent landlords were the predominant class, centralized absolutism arose, such as Russia. If an area would have both classes more or less equal, a combination of state forms would develop, for example as happened in France and England, according to Tilly. Eventually, all states will develop into the type of state form that Tilly calls the nation state.

With this theory, Tilly questions previous formulations of state development in Europe, arguing that they are unsuccessful in explaining the great variety in kinds of states that have prevailed at different stages of European history since AD 990. He says that they fail "because they locate explanations of state-to-state variation in individual characteristics of states rather than relations among them, and because they assume implicitly a deliberate effect to construct the sorts of substantial, centralized states that come to dominate European life during the nineteenth and twentieth centuries."

Unlike other theories, like the idea of the social contract, Tilly stated that "[w]ar wove the European network of national states, and preparation for war created the internal structures of states within it."

Interaction between the rulers on one hand and the manipulators of capital on the other, resulted in three state formations, Tilly argues. These state formations are tribute-taking empires, systems of fragmented sovereignty, and national states.

=== From militarization to civilianization ===
Tilly notes a "central paradox" in his theory of European state building: "the pursuit of war and military capacity, after having created national states as a sort of by-product, led to a civilianization of government and domestic politics". According to Tilly, this transfer of power from armed forces to civilian entities was not so much a tug-of-war but rather happened incrementally. The nature of power—coercion—did not change, but the individuals that wielded it did. Tilly provides five main reasons for this incremental transition (p. 206):

1. The building up and maintenance of military forces required massive extractive structures that were run by civilians, eventually forming a counterweight to the same military forces;
2. War making forced states to legitimize civilian input since it had to bargain for necessary resources with civilian entities;
3. War making dramatically expanded the state and did not downsize its capacities at the end of conflicts;
4. Individuals involved in war making were promised dues at the end of the war, and thus legitimately claimed their dues at demobilization;
5. Borrowing during conflicts led to bureaucracies being created to service the skyrocketing state debts, which in turn encouraged states to intervene in the local economy.

=== State-building in the developing world ===
Jeffrey Herbst is an example of a scholar who builds on Tilly's theory. Herbst explains the relative failure of state building in Africa by the lack of external threats that forced European leaders to concentrate capital and power.

Tilly concludes his book, however, emphasizing caution in applying his model to contemporary state-building. Tilly argues that the militarization of politics in many developing countries should not be understood as a step towards the development of a stable nation state. He asserts that current conditions of state formation at the time of writing are vastly different from what they were in Europe over his study period. First, Tilly notes that the military apparatus in developing countries today is not generally concerned with conquering or defending territory, as opposed to European armies (p. 207). Thus, they turn their full capacity to internal control, so that the objective is not to control territory but populations. Second, Tilly writes that the Cold War has led to a competition between the United States and the Soviet Union to arm, fund and control developing countries, especially their militaries. Thus, military groups thrived as other organizations withered. Progressively, the military was better able to control the state, whereas civilian organizations could not rival its strength. In other words, Tilly argues that the military groups that run contemporary developing states have little in common with their European counterparts.

He further proposes three hypotheses to start to theorize the lack of civilianization in developing countries (p. 220):

1. Failure of civilian institutions that lead to military intervention;
2. Disproportionate external support for the military;
3. No institutional tool to bargain and contain the military since it is artificially funded externally.

Tilly's main claim is thus that the European nation-state as it was constructed is certainly not a de facto endgame, or ideal polity model. In fact, Tilly argues that it is improbable that current Third World states follow exactly the same processus of state building—and we should not expect them to do so.

== Reception ==
=== Academic discussion ===
==== Tarrow, 2008 ====
American sociologist Sidney Tarrow discussed the book during a 2008 conference organized by the Social Science Research Council in honor of Charles Tilly. During his talk, he addressed what he saw as four gaps in the book:

1. The scope conditions of Tilly's theory. War is seen by Tilly as the "prime mover of early modern European state-making, because its requisites led to processes of extraction, protection, production, and distribution." However, Tarrow wonders how that can explain non-European states and states that formed more recently, such as post-colonial states. There is a lot of literature on "correcting Tilly" on state-building in the global South and elsewhere.
2. The theory's internal validity. In the 1975 book The Formation of National States in Western Europe, Tilly critiques Joseph Strayer's model of state formation. However, in Coercion, Capital, and European States, "the successful cases looked remarkably like Strayer's model."
3. There is no attention for the role of religion and capitalism in European state development, while Tarrow argues "[w]e know how deeply Catholic/Protestant conflicts divided Europe in the Thirty Year's War, and how the settlement of that conflict produced the European state system after the Treaty of Westphalia." Concerning capitalism, Tarrow said that "not all European states were equally in need of domestic capital to finance their wars", referring to Sweden under King Gustav III.
4. The role of rights in state development in the United States, characterized by the so-called "War on Terror". According to Tarrow, Tilly "saw his country at risk of abandoning its devotion to its regime of rights."

==== Leander, 2004 ====
French/Swedish sociologist Anna Leander examined Tilly's relevance twenty years later in her article Wars and the Un-Making of States: Taking Tilly Seriously in the Contemporary World. Leander argues that the "war makes states" no longer holds for four reasons:

1. State-building. While rulers' competition for controlling coercion is a crucial element of Tilly's hypothesis, today's rulers "take increasingly minor roles in the organization of coercion". State-building is not a product of interstate conflict anymore but rather of diplomacy and high-politics.
2. Privatization of coercion. Another crucial element – the rulers' monopoly on legitimate violence – is disappearing. Europe and North America have seen a growth of 10 per cent per years in private security companies taking over the state prerogatives since the 1970s, a Peace Research Institute Frankfurt report shows.
3. Privatization of capital. Just like coercion, controlling capital is a crucial element in Tilly's hypothesis, as wars are expensive. However, national economics is a function of international economics and subject to international norms, rules, and regulations in the modern world.
4. Different interest groups. Tilly concludes that the civilianization of government evolved through the bargaining between rulers and their citizens. However, "the privatization of coercion and capital and the decentralization of political power has left rulers as brokers between different [...] interest groups rather than ruling them from a national center".

== 1992 edition ==
A revised edition of the book was published in 1992 with the title Coercion, Capital, and European States AD 990–1992. For that edition, Tilly made minor revisions throughout the book and added an extra section discussing the rapid changes in Central and Eastern Europe after the dissolution of the Soviet Union.

== See also ==
- State formation
- Nation state
- Polity
