= State formation =

Development of a central political authority

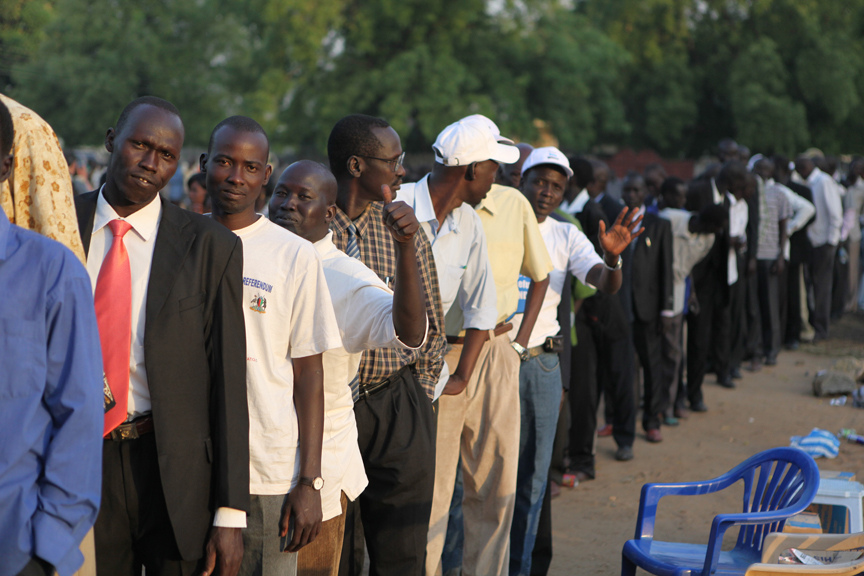
Voters waiting in line to vote in South Sudan (2011) to decide whether to form a new state or remain with Sudan

State formation is the process of the development of a centralized government structure in a situation in which one did not exist. State formation has been a study of many disciplines of the social sciences for a number of years, so much so that Jonathan Haas writes, "One of the favorite pastimes of social scientists over the course of the past century has been to theorize about the evolution of the world's great civilizations."

The study of state formation is divided generally into the study of ancient state formation (those that developed in stateless societies), medieval or early modern state formation, and the study of modern state formation (particularly of the form that developed in Europe in the 17th century and spread around the world). State formation can include state-building and nation-building.

Academic debate about various theories is a prominent feature in fields like anthropology, sociology, economics, and political science. Dominant frameworks emphasize the superiority of the state as an organization for waging war and extracting resources. Prominent theories for medieval, early modern, and modern state formation emphasize the roles of warfare, commerce, contracts, and cultural diffusion in ushering in the state as a dominant organizational form. More recent and integrative studies suggest a cross-civilizational interactive process leading to the formation of early states.

== The state ==
There is no academic consensus on the definition of the state. The term "state" refers to a set of different, but interrelated and often overlapping, theories about a certain range of political phenomena. According to Walter Scheidel, mainstream definitions of the state have the following in common: "centralized institutions that impose rules, and back them up by force, over a territorially circumscribed population; a distinction between the rulers and the ruled; and an element of autonomy, stability, and differentiation. These distinguish the state from less stable forms of organization, such as the exercise of chiefly power."

The most commonly used definition is by Max Weber who describes the state as a compulsory political organization with a centralized government that maintains a monopoly of the legitimate use of force within a certain territory. Weber writes that the state "is a human community that (successfully) claims the monopoly of the legitimate use of physical force within a given territory."

Charles Tilly defines states as "coercion-wielding organisations that are distinct from households and kinship groups and exercise clear priority in some respects over all other organizations within substantial territories." The state is considered to be territoriality bound and is distinct from tribes, lineages, firms, churches and other units without centralized institutions.

Tilly defines a state's "essential minimal activities" as:

1. War-making – "eliminating or neutralizing their own rivals"
2. State-making – "eliminating or neutralizing their rivals inside their own territory"
3. Protection – "eliminating or neutralizing the enemies of their clients"
4. Extraction – "acquiring the means of carrying out the first three activities"
5. Adjudication – "authoritative settlement of disputes among members of the population"
6. Distribution – "intervention in the allocation of goods among the members of the population"
7. Production – "control of the creation and transformation of goods and services produced by the population"

Jeffrey Herbst holds that there is another relevant characteristic of modern states: nationalism. This feeling of belonging to a certain territory plays a central role in state formation since it increases citizens' willingness to pay taxes.

According to Michael Hechter and William Brustein, the modern state was differentiated from "leagues of independent cities, empires, federations held together by loose central control, and theocratic federations" by four characteristics:

1. The modern state sought and achieved territorial expansion and consolidation
2. The modern state achieved unprecedented control over social, economic, and cultural activities within its boundaries
3. The modern state established ruling institutions that were separate from other institutions
4. The ruler of the modern state was far better at monopolizing the means of violence

== Explaining early and modern states ==
Theories of state formation have two distinct focuses, depending largely on the field of study:

1. The early transition in human society from tribal communities into larger political organizations. Studies of this topic, often in anthropology, explore the initial development of basic administrative structures in areas where states developed from stateless societies. Although state formation was an active research agenda in anthropology and archaeology until the 1980s, some of the effort has changed to focus not on why these states formed but on how they operated.
2. In contrast, studies in political science and in sociology have focused significantly on the formation of the modern state.

Scholars differ in their definition of the state and in the time periods in which state formation occurred.

=== Ancient state formation ===
Table of primary states with region and approximate time of formation from Sandeford
state	region	approximate date
Susa	Mesopotamia, southwestern Iran	ca 4000–3000 BCE
Uruk	Mesopotamia, southern Iraq	ca 4000–3000 BCE
Hierakonpolis	upper Egypt	ca 3500–3100 BCE
Harappa	Indus Valley, western India, eastern Pakistan (Punjab, Rajasthan, Sind, Gujarat)	ca 2600–2000 BCE
Erlitou	central China (Shanxi and Henan)	ca 1900–1500 BCE
Monte Albán	Oaxaca valley, southern Mexico	ca 300 BCE–200 CE
Teotihuacan	Basin of Mexico, central Mexico	ca 100–1 BCE
Virú	Virú valley, coastal northern Peru	ca 200 BCE–200 CE
Tiwanaku	Lake Titicaca, northern Bolivia	ca 300–600 CE
Hawaiʻi	Hawaiian islands	ca 800–1800 CE

States are minimally defined by anthropologist David S. Sandeford as socially stratified and bureaucratically governed societies with at least four levels of settlement hierarchy (e.g., a large capital, cities, villages, and hamlets). Primary states are those state societies that developed in regions where no states existed before. These states developed by strictly internal processes and interaction with other non-states societies. The exact number of cases which qualify as primary states is not clearly known because of limited information about political organization before the development of writing in many places, but Sandeford lists ten likely cases of primary state formation in Eurasia, the Americas, and the Pacific.

Studies on the formation of the first states tend to focus on processes that made statehood feasible. Prominent explanations for the emergence of the first states emphasize domestication of plants and animals, as well as complex water management systems. Some scholars point to greater land productivity as a prerequisite for the state, whereas others point to the adoption of easy-to-tax crops, such as cereal grains. Some scholars point to military revolutions rooted in bronze metallurgy and iron metallurgy, which made it easier for large states to control and conquer vast territories.

Examples of early states which developed in interaction with other states include the Aegean Bronze Age Greek civilizations and the Malagasy civilization in Madagascar. Unlike primary state formation, early state formation does not require the creation of the first state in that cultural context or autonomous development, independently from state development nearby. Early state formation causation can thus include borrowing, imposition, and other forms of interaction with already existing states.

=== Pre-modern state formation ===
Pre-modern state formation occurred in China during the and after the Warring States period (475–221 BCE). State formation occurred in Japan and Korea during the period 400–800 CE. The key institutional innovation of East Asian state formation was the world's first civil services.

Early state formation in Europe happened in the late 9th century to the early 11th century, as stable kingdoms formed in Germany, France and Britain; three stable, large kingdoms formed in Scandinavia (Denmark, Norway and Sweden), as well as three in East Central Europe (Poland, Bohemia and Hungary). Historian R.I. Moore argues that 970–1215 was the crucial period in European state formation.

Historian Sverre Bagge argues that "in its main features, the European state system seems to have been formed between the division of the Carolingian Empire and around 1200. At the latter date, there were fifteen kingdoms in Europe: Britain, France, Castile, Aragon, Portugal, Navarra, Sicily, Germany, Poland, Bohemia, Hungary, Denmark, Norway and Sweden." Of these 15 kingdoms, seven were still in existence by 1648. Of those that disappeared, it was usually due to marriage alliances and hereditary succession.

Some scholars such as Charles Tilly and Otto Hintze primarily characterize European state formation as an early modern 16th to 18th century phenomenon, emphasizing the establishment of state sovereignty in international relations. Some date state formation later to the early 19th century, pointing to the establishment of a monopoly on violence within a demarcated territory.

=== Modern state formation ===
Early Modern State

Scholars generally agree that the modern state system originated with the signing of the Treaty of Westphalia in 1648, which established the concept of state sovereignty. Notably, this event marked the shift from the medieval practice of feudalism to the emergence of increasingly centralized state systems that secured monopolies over violence and effectively extracted revenue from their civilian populations. There are two existing explanations for this transition: dramatic shifts in Europe's political, economic, and cultural climate and changes in Europe's natural environment.

Political change in Europe during this period can be attributed to improvements in military technology and increased warfare between Western European states, as they catalyzed the formation of vast state-controlled militaries and large state bureaucracies for levying taxes. Economically, Western European states saw a drastic increase in tax revenue due to the emergence of a merchant middle class, the establishment of overseas empires, and increased rates of domestic production. Finally, cultural values in Europe changed as ruling classes abandoned feudalism and people moved away from traditional religious practices (due to events such as the Protestant Reformation and the Enlightenment).

In terms of the natural environment, Europe experienced a sudden population boom during this period due to a rise in food production. The resulting increase in Europe's population density accelerated state centralization in the region.

Late Modern State

The majority of late-forming states emerged during the decolonization period that followed World War 2 and the aftermath of the dissolution of the Soviet Union in 1991. Traditional scholars hold that newer states were introduced to modern state systems through Western European colonial rule and, upon obtaining independence, merged them with local forms of governance.

In recent years, however, there has been increased criticism of the Eurocentric approach to late-state formation within the academic community. Shmuel Eisenstadt was one of the first scholars to give voice to this criticism when he argued that there are "Multiple Modernities" rather than just the widely accepted Western "patterns of modernity". Since then, many scholars have begun to approach state formation with a more inclusive perspective. For instance, in The Eastern Origins of Western Civilization, John Hobson investigates eastern modern state formation and shows how the western Enlightenment took inspiration from the eastern world, especially East Asia.

Newer states formed under drastically different conditions than older states did. For one, these new states developed during an era that had little to no overt conflict between states. In addition to this, imperialist empires stunted the economic development of their colonies, leaving most new states impoverished upon achieving independence. Finally, since colonial powers drew territorial borders with little regard towards religious, ethnic, and cultural differences within indigenous populations, civilians in most new states lacked a shared identity. As a result of these circumstances, many new states failed to effectively monopolize the means of violence and extract revenue from their citizens, making them (as a general rule) weaker than older states.

Theories on the formation of modern states focus on the processes that support the development of modern states, particularly those that formed in late-medieval Europe and then spread around the world with colonialism. Starting in the 1940s and 1950s, with decolonization processes underway, attention began to focus on the formation and construction of modern states with significant bureaucracies, ability to tax, and territorial sovereignty around the world. However, some scholars hold that the modern state model formed in other parts of the world prior to colonialism, but that colonial structures replaced it. When thinking about the current global political climate, it is easy to conflate the concepts of nations and states with one another. In his book "Comparative Politics", David Samuels articulates the idea that a state is a non tangible entity that regulates the actions of its citizens in a defined territory, while a nation refers to a group of people who share a commonality, whether that be a similar language or ethnic identity (David, 2010). To get to the modernly defined state, we can trace its emergence to European nations that assembled states after the Enlightenment period for a myriad of reasons. Using the contractarian view of the state, scholars accredit state function with reducing the harmful effects of citizens' desires to act in their own self interests, without respect to their fellow citizens (Roberts, Golder, Nadecnichek Golder, 2019). By establishing states, people are spared the chaos of Hobbes' "state of nature", where every individual will only act in their own interest and therefore harm thy neighbor (Samuels, 2010; Moehler, 2009) European states formed in alliance with the contractarian view of the state because of their lucky population boom in medieval times as a result of a food surplus, shift in power reverence from papal figures to non secular individuals, and their fear of being conquered by others (David, 2010). States that had successful economies were able to invade and conquer the weaker states in their regions, causing many states to increase the revenues they derived from their citizens and tax them at higher rates and the citizens of these states to act in accordance with social contract theory. After recognizing the kinship they felt to the individuals who also lived in their constrained territory and their preference for the stipulations of their current government over an invading one, the members of European societies gave into the bounds of social contract theory and cooperated in paying higher taxes in order to protect their territories. In reality, majority of early European states failed because the weaker, smaller states were taken over by their more powerful neighbors who were able to extort more revenue from their citizens and thus better prepare themselves for interstate war and conquest. The origin of the modern state can be traced back to these instances of European conflicts and geographical changes in the range of the 1500s to the 1600s, as they classify the moments citizens put the needs of the state over their financial interests and entrusted the state with greater powers to govern them.

Imperfect Conditions that Inhibit the Advancement of Later State Formation

States on the African continent do not reflect the same efficiency of European state consolidation, likely because their boundaries were artificially carved out by colonial powers during the Partition of Africa in 1884 and 1885. As a result of the colonists' uneducated divisions of the continent, nations were split by new boundaries and segmented into different countries. By reducing the power of nationalism, as nations were not united in the states devised by the colonists, African states' struggled to grow economically. Furthermore, African states have not been able to reap the benefits of state generation of greater revenues because they have not had any reason to willingly pay higher rates in taxes or mobilize against any external threat. African states most typically gained independence peacefully, thus not receiving the benefits of the economic booms associated with wartime efforts, and they also have accepted the boundaries drawn up by colonizers. These two factors have been detrimental to the growth of African states, as there is no recognized alternative to nationalism or war efforts in terms of generating economic prosperity; some would argue federalist policies as a possible way of elevating the status of state's economy, though these policies typically result in the corruption and autocratic behavior of the state's leaders. African states are also marred by the long lasting effects of European colonialism, beyond the extent of the artificial boundaries of their states, but in the ways many African states were forced to use government systems the colonists had designed (Samuels 2010). Though many African states were peacefully granted independence, the long lasting effects of colonialism's exploitation of their land, people, and makeshift governments further inhibited the abilities of African states to progress economically in the same time frame as European states had.

== Theories about early state development ==
There are a number of different theories and hypotheses regarding early state formation that seek generalizations to explain why the state developed in some places but not others. Other scholars believe that generalizations are unhelpful and that each case of early state formation should be treated on its own.

The earliest forms of the state emerged whenever it became possible to centralize power in a durable way. Agriculture and a settled population have been attributed as necessary conditions to form states. Certain types of agriculture are more conducive to state formation, such as grain (wheat, barley, millet), because they are suited to concentrated production, taxation, and storage.

=== Voluntary theories ===
Uruk, one of the prime sites for research into early state formation.

Voluntary theories contend that diverse groups of people came together to form states as a result of some shared rational interest. The theories largely focus on the development of agriculture, and the population and organizational pressure that followed and resulted in state formation. The argument is that such pressures result in integrative pressure for rational people to unify and create a state. Much of the social contract philosophical tradition proposed a voluntary theory for state formation.

One of the most prominent theories of early and primary state formation is the hydraulic hypothesis, which contends that the state was a result of the need to build and maintain large-scale irrigation projects. The theory was most significantly detailed by Karl August Wittfogel's argument that, in arid environments, farmers would be confronted by the production limits of small-scale irrigation. Eventually different agricultural producers would join in response to population pressure and the arid environment, to create a state apparatus that could build and maintain large irrigation projects.

In addition to this, is what Carneiro calls the automatic hypothesis, which contends that the development of agriculture easily produces conditions necessary for the development of a state. With surplus food stocks created by agricultural development, creation of distinct worker classes and a division of labor would automatically trigger creation of the state form.

A third voluntary hypothesis, particularly common with some explanations of early state development, is that long-distance trade networks created an impetus for states to develop at key locations: such as ports or oases. For example, the increased trade in the 16th century may have been a key to state formation in West African states such as Whydah, Dahomey, and the Benin Empire.

=== Conflict theories ===
Conflict theories of state formation regard conflict and dominance of some population over another population as key to the formation of states. In contrast with voluntary theories, these arguments believe that people do not voluntarily agree to create a state to maximize benefits, but that states form due to some form of oppression by one group over others. A number of different theories rely on conflict, dominance, or oppression as a causal process or as a necessary mechanism within certain conditions and they may borrow from other approaches. In general the theories highlight: economic stratification, conquest of other peoples, conflict in circumscribed areas, and the neo-evolutionary growth of bureaucracy.

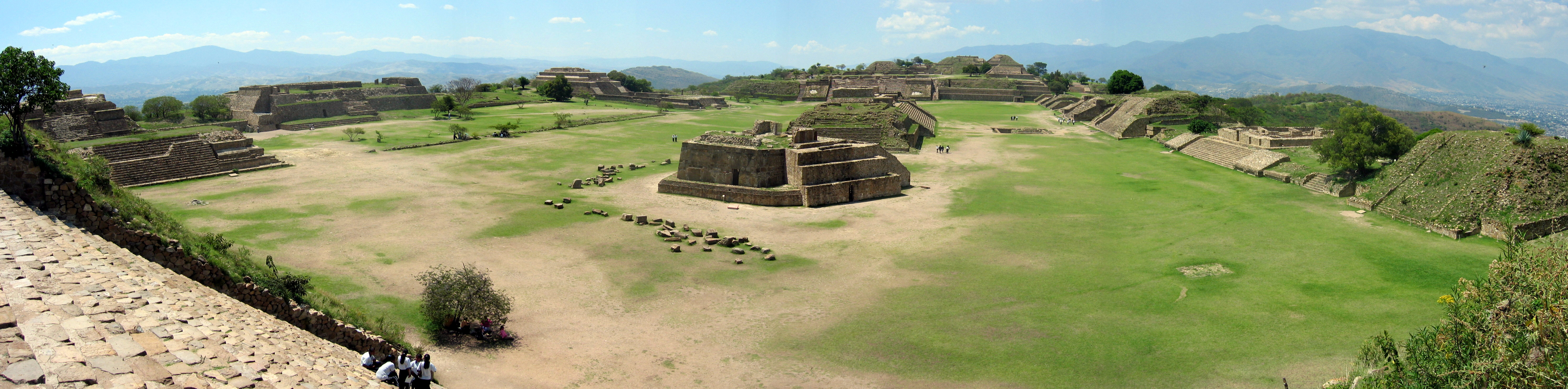
Panorama of Monte Albán in present-day Mexico, seen from the South Platform. Archeologists oftentimes look for evidence of such "large-scale construction projects, trade networks, and religious systems" to identify early states.

- Economic stratification

Friedrich Engels articulated one of the earliest theories of the state based on anthropological evidence in The Origin of the Family, Private Property and the State (1884). The theory of Engels developed from study of Ancient Society (1877) by Lewis H. Morgan and from the sketches of this work by Karl Marx on the Asiatic mode of production. Engels argues that the state developed as a result of the need to protect private property. The theory contended that surplus production as a result of the development of agriculture created a division and specialization of labor, leading to classes who worked the land and to those who could devote time to other tasks. Class antagonism and the need to secure the private property of those living on the surplus production produced by agriculturalists resulted in the creation of the state. The anthropologist Morton Fried (1923–1986) further developed this approach, positing social stratification as the primary dynamic underlying the development of the state.

- Conquest theories

Similar to the economic stratification theories, the conquest theory contends that a single city establishes a state in order to control other tribes or settlements it has conquered. The theory has its roots in the work of Ibn Khaldun (1332–1406) and of Jean Bodin (1530–1596), but it was first organized around anthropological evidence by Franz Oppenheimer (1864–1943). Oppenheimer argues that the state was created to cement inequality between peoples that resulted from conquest.

- Carneiro's circumscription theory

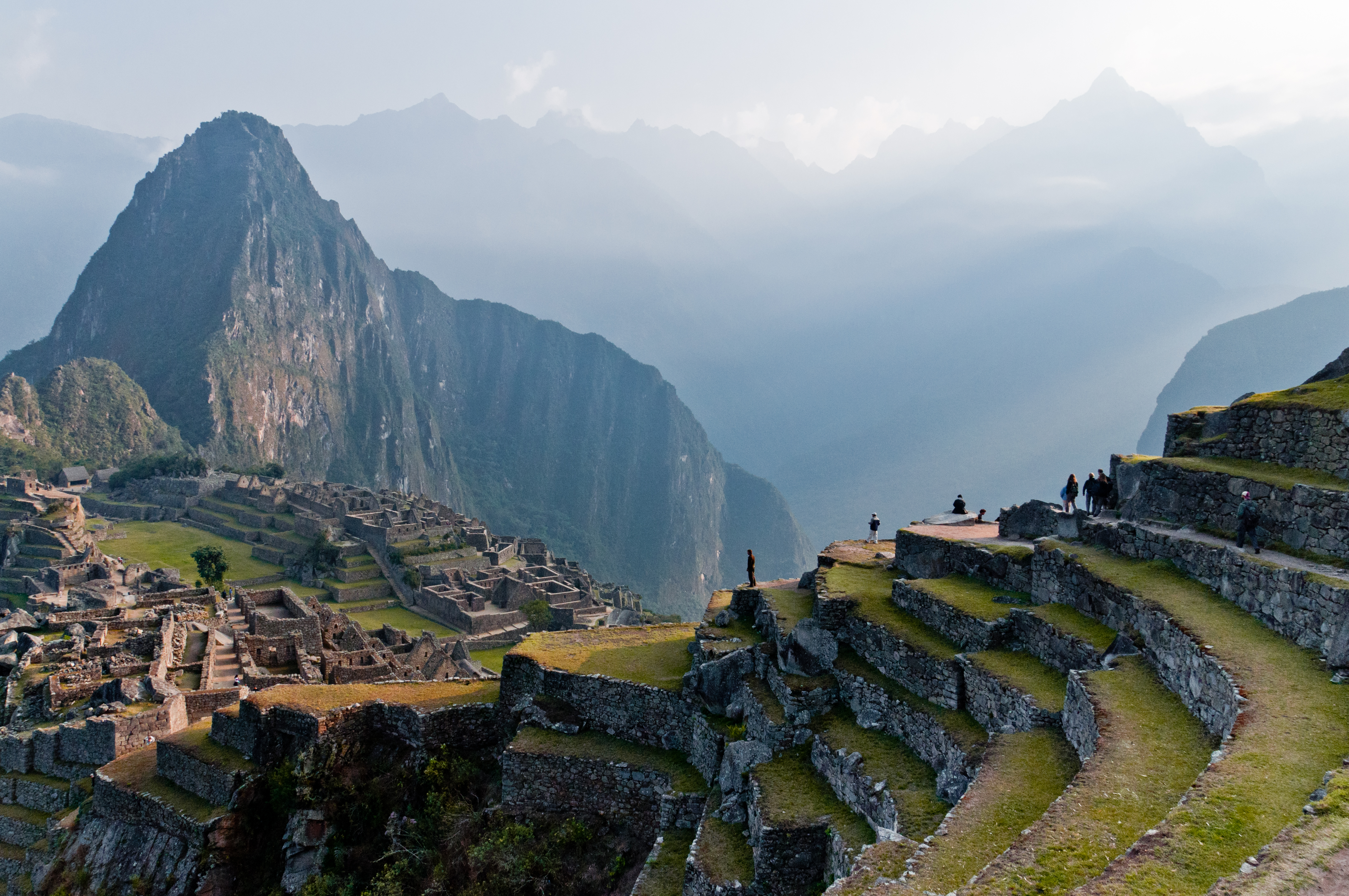
The mountain Huayna Picchu overlooks the ruins of Machu Picchu. The Andes mountains circumscribed much of the region.

Robert Carneiro developed a theory (1970) aiming to provide a more nuanced understanding of state formation by accounting for the fact that many factors (surplus agriculture, warfare, irrigation, conquest, etc.) did not produce states in all situations. He concluded that while population pressure and warfare were mechanisms of state formation, they only created states in geographic regions circumscribed, or walled off from the surrounding area. Geographic barriers (or in some cases barriers created by nomadic raiders or by rival societies) create limitations on the ability of the people to deal with production shortfalls, and the result is that warfare results in state creation. In situations of unlimited agricultural land (like the Amazon or the Eastern United States), Carneiro believes that the pressures did not exist and so warfare allowed people to move elsewhere and thus did not spur creation of a state.

- Neoevolutionary theories

A number of different theories, sometimes connected with some of the processes above, explain state formation in terms of the evolution of leadership systems. This argument sees human society as evolving from tribes or chiefdoms into states through a gradual process of transformation that lets a small group hierarchically structure society and maintain order through appropriation of symbols of power. Groups that gained power in tribal society gradually worked towards building the hierarchy and segmentation that created the state.

Elman Service (1915–1996) proposed that, unlike in economic stratification theories, the state largely creates stratification in society rather than being created to defend that stratification. Bureaucracy evolves to support the leadership structure in tribes and uses religious hierarchy and economic stratification as a means to further increase its power. Warfare may play a key role in the situation, because it allows leaders to distribute benefits in ways that serve their interests, however it is a constant that feeds the system rather than an autonomous factor. Similarly, anthropologist Henry T. Wright argues (2006) that competitive and conflictual environments produce political experimentation leading to the development of the state. As opposed to theories that the state develops through chance or tinkering, experimentation involves a more directed process where tribal leaders learn from organization forms of the past and from the outcomes they produced.

=== Other theories ===
Other aspects are highlighted in different theories as being of contributing importance. It is sometimes claimed that technological development, religious development, or socialization of members are crucial to state development. However, most of these factors are found to be secondary in anthropological analysis. In addition to conquest, some theories contend that the need for defense from military conquest or the military organization to conquer other peoples is the key aspect leading to state formation.

=== Discredited theories ===
Some theories proposed in the 19th century and early 20th century have since been largely discredited by anthropologists. Carneiro writes that theories "with a racial basis, for example, are now so thoroughly discredited that they need not be dealt with...We can also reject the belief that the state is an expression of the 'genius' of a people, or that it arose through a 'historical accident.' Such notions make the state appear to be something metaphysical or adventitious, and thus place it beyond scientific understanding." Similarly, social Darwinist perspectives like those of Walter Bagehot in Physics and Politics argued that the state form developed as a result of the best leaders and organized societies gradually gaining power until a state resulted. Such explanations are not considered sufficient to explain the formation of the state.

== Theories about modern state development ==
In the medieval period (500–1400) in Europe, there were a variety of authority forms throughout the region. These included feudal lords, empires, religious authorities, free cities, and other authorities. Often dated to the 1648 Peace of Westphalia, there began to be the development in Europe of modern states with large-scale capacity for taxation, coercive control of their populations, and advanced bureaucracies. The state became prominent in Europe over the next few centuries before the particular form of the state spread to the rest of the world via the colonial and international pressures of the 19th century and 20th century. Other modern states developed in Africa and Asia prior to colonialism, but were largely displaced by colonial rule.

Political scientists, sociologists, and anthropologists began studying the state formation processes in Europe and elsewhere in the 17th century—beginning significantly with Max Weber. However, state formation became a primary interest in the 1970s. The question was often framed as a contest between state forces and society forces and the study of how the state became prominent over particular societies. A number of theories developed regarding state development in Europe. Other theories focused on the creation of states in late colonial and post-colonial societies. The lessons from these studies of the formation of states in the modern period are often used in theories about State-building. Other theories contend that the state in Europe was constructed in connection with peoples from outside Europe and that focusing on state formation in Europe as a foundation for study silences the diverse history of state formation.

Based on the model of European states, it has been commonly assumed that development is the natural path that states will eventually walk through. However, Herbst holds that in the case African states, as well as in developing countries of other regions, development need not be the natural step. States that struggle their consolidation could remain permanently weak.

There are three prominent categories of explanations for the emergence of the modern state as a dominant polity: (1) Security-based explanations that emphasize the role of warfare, (2) Economy-based explanations that emphasize trade, property rights and capitalism as drivers behind state formation, and (3) Institutionalist theories that sees the state as an organizational form that is better able to resolve conflict and cooperation problems than competing political organizations. According to Philip Gorski and Vivek Swaroop Sharma, the "neo-Darwinian" framework for the emergence of sovereign states is the dominant explanation in the scholarship. The neo-Darwininian framework emphasizes how the modern state emerged as the dominant organizational form through natural selection and competition. Thomas Ertman wrote in 1997, "it is now generally accepted that the territorial state triumphed over other possible political forms (empire, city-state, lordship) because of the superior fighting ability which it derived from access to both urban capital and coercive authority over peasant taxpayers and army recruits."

According to Hendrik Spruyt, the modern state is different from its predecessor polities in two main aspects: (1) Modern states have greater capacity to intervene in their societies, and (2) Modern states are buttressed by the principle of international legal sovereignty and the juridical equivalence of states. The two features began to emerge in the Late Middle Ages but the modern state form took centuries to come firmly into fruition. Spruyt notes that sovereign equality did not become fully global until after World War II amid decolonization. Adom Getachew writes that it was not until the 1960 Declaration on the Granting of Independence to Colonial Countries and Peoples that the international legal context for popular sovereignty was instituted.

=== Warfare theories ===
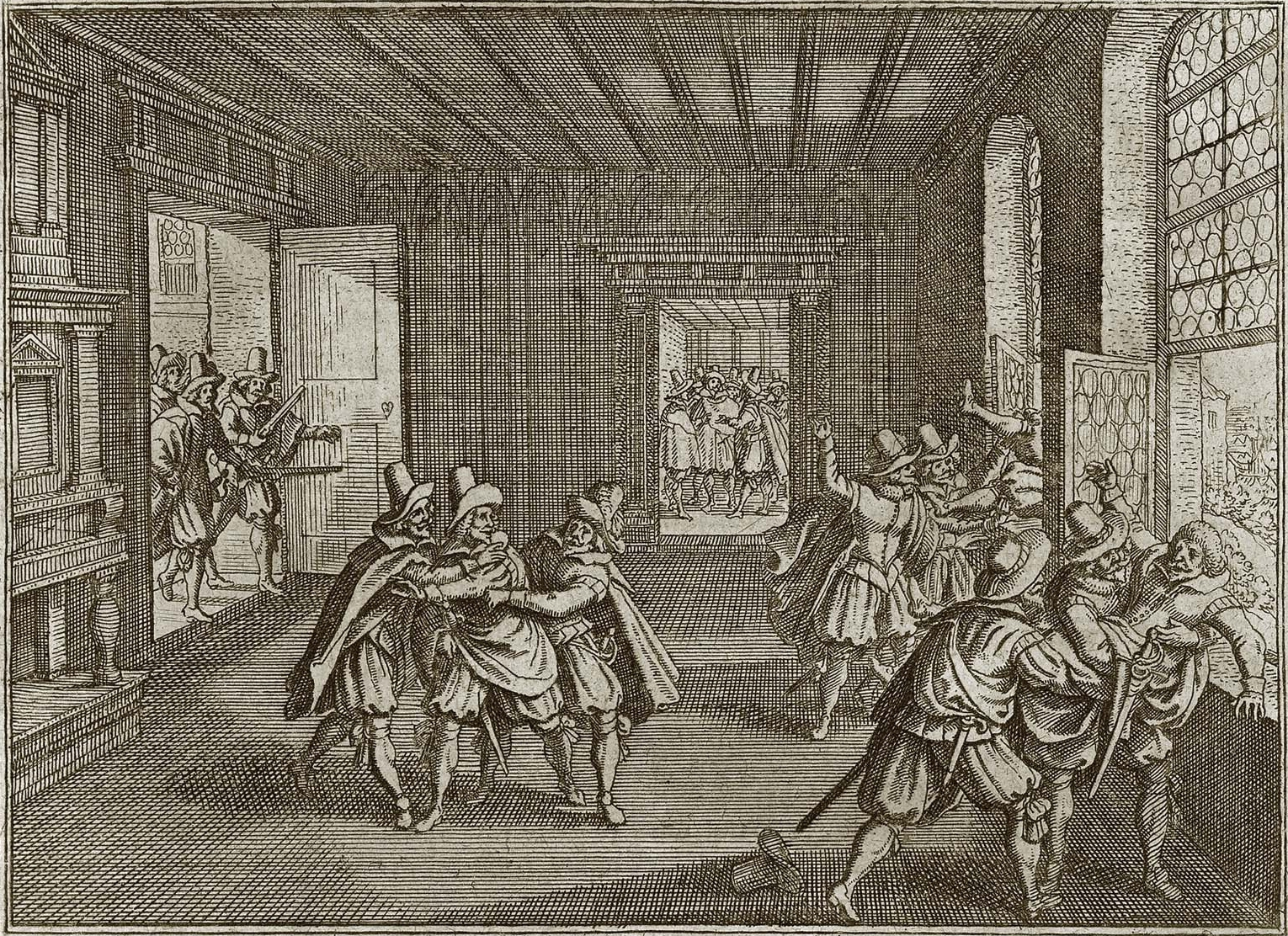
A woodcut of the Defenestrations of Prague in 1618—which began the Thirty Years' War and ended with the Peace of Westphalia that started the recognition of the modern state

Two related theories are based on military development and warfare, and the role that these forces played in state formation.

Charles Tilly developed an argument that the state developed largely as a result of "state-makers" who sought to increase the taxes they could gain from the people under their control so they could continue fighting wars. According to Tilly, the state makes war and war makes states. In the centuries of constant warfare in Europe, coupled with expanded costs of war with mass armies and gunpowder, warlords had to find ways to finance war and control territory more effectively. The modern state presented the opportunity for them to develop taxation structures, the coercive structure to implement that taxation, and finally the guarantee of protection from other states that could get much of the population to agree. Taxes and revenue raising have been repeatedly pointed out as a key aspect of state formation and the development of state capacity. Economist Nicholas Kaldor emphasized on the importance of revenue raising and warned about the dangers of the dependence on foreign aid. Tilly argues, state making is similar to organized crime because it is a "quintessential protection racket with the advantage of legitimacy." Tilly's theory is prominent in the field of historical sociology, where scholars have tended to identify the onset of modern state formation as coinciding with the military revolution in the 16th century.

Michael Roberts and Geoffrey Parker agree with Tilly that warfare was a key factor, but that the primary causal factor was not the "state-makers" themselves, but simply the military technological revolutions that allowed development of larger armies. The argument is that with the expanded state of warfare, the state became the only administrative unit that could endure in the constant warfare in the Europe of this period, because only it could develop large enough armies. This view—that the modern state replaced chaos and general violence with internal disciplinary structures—has been challenged as ethnocentric, and ignoring the violence of modern states. A 1999 statistical analysis by William R. Thompson and Karen Rasler found support for the notion that major, regional warfare was linked to an increase in army size, but that a military technology revolution was not.

Scholars have debated the applicability of bellicist theories of state formation to non-European regions. Economists Mark Dincecco, James Fenske, Anil Menon, and Shivaji Mukherjee have found evidence for Tilly's thesis in the development of the Indian state, as they show that "districts that were more exposed to pre-colonial conflict experienced greater early state-making." Others have argued that bellicist theories can account for state formation in China during the Warring States period, Latin America and Africa. According to Jeffrey Herbst, external security threats have had a fundamental role in the development of the South Korean and Taiwanese states. However, Chin-Hao Huang and Dave Kang argue that Tilly's bellicist theory of state formation does not account for Korea and Japan, as they did not face intense security threats. Robert Holden and Miguel Angel Centeno find limited evidence for the applicability of the bellicist theory to state formation in Latin America. A 2017 study which tests the predictions of warfare theories of Tilly and others found that the predictions do not match the empirical record. The study found that median state size decreased from 1100 to 1800, and that the number of states increases rapidly between the twelfth and thirteen centuries and remained constant until 1800.

Historian Sverre Bagge argues that neither external nor internal wars were important per se in processes of state formation. To what extent warfare was important in state formation, it was indirectly "by mobilizing the aristocracy in the king's service and by necessitating drastically increased taxation and bureaucratization." Furthermore, he argues that the chronology of events in China and Europe are inconsistent with Tilly's argument that increasing costs of warfare led to processes of state formation. Substantial technological and organizational changes that raised the cost of warfare happened in Europe during the same period as when China unified, but Europe did not have unification during that period. Bagge also argues that the number of states did not meaningfully reduce, even though new military technology gave advantages to larger and wealthier units. He writes that "there are relatively few examples in Europe of kingdoms formed by conquest." Historian Ian Morris similarly disagrees with Tilly's thesis; Morris turns it around and says "War made the state and the state made peace." Vivek Swaroop Sharma distinguishes between total wars of conquest and limited wars, arguing that total wars of territorial conquest were infrequent between Western states.

Anna Grzymala-Busse lists three major theoretical critiques of the bellicist theories: First, state formation needs peace and stability in order to succeed (war can destabilize regimes and institutions, as well as deplete state resources). Second, rulers did not just compete for territory but also policy-making authority (which meant that rulers cooperated to agree on borders rather than seek to expand borders). Third, the domestic balance of power and the agreements reached between domestic elites may have been more important for state formation than international warfare.

Hendrik Spruyt has several critiques of bellicist theories: First, neither the presence of warfare nor states can be taken as exogenous factors. Bellicist theories fail to explain why Europe was defined by such a competitive environment. Second, the bellicist theories do not specify the micro processes, such as the advantages for rulers in adopting certain institutions, and the incentives for elites and rivals to support or oppose rulers. Third, Spruyt argues that war was neither a necessary nor sufficient condition for state formation, pointing to the survival of small and odd states, the development of states in the absence of warfare, and the absence of state consolidation until German and Italian unification in the 19th century.

=== Economic transformation theories ===
Other theories have emphasized the role of trade, finance and urbanization in state formation. These theories emphasize the end of the feudal system and the economic transformations that ensued. Some such theories are neo-marxist whereas other theories are new institutionalist. New institutionalists such as Douglass North argue that state centralization happened as contracts and agreements were made between rulers and influential economic groups within their territory. The ruler could provide public goods in the form of property rights and protection while getting revenue in the form of taxation from the economic groups.

Stein Rokkan and others have argued that the modern territorial state developed in places that were peripheral to the commercial "city belt" ("a central regional band extending, roughly, in an arc from the Low Countries, through the Rhineland and into Northern Italy") that ran through Central Europe. The existence of prosperous urban centers that relied on commerce in Central Europe prevented rulers from consolidating their rule over others. The elites in those urban centers could rely on their wealth and on collective security institutions (like the Hanseatic or Swabian league) with other urban centers to sustain their independence. A lower density of urban centers in England and France made it easier for rulers to establish rule over expansive territories.

Michael Hechter and William Brustein argue that historical modes of production determined the spatial pattern of state formation: Areas with a feudal mode of production (rather than a sedentary pastoral or petty commodity mode of production) were more likely to form a core for state formation.

=== Feudal crisis theories ===
Another argument contends that the state developed out of economic and social crises that were prominent in late-medieval Europe. Religious wars between Catholics and Protestants, and the involvement of leaders in the domains of other leaders under religious reasons was the primary problem dealt with in the Peace of Westphalia. In addition, Marxist theory contends that the economic crisis of feudalism forced the aristocracy to adapt various centralized forms of organization so they could retain economic power, and this resulted in the formation of the modern state.

=== Cultural theories ===
Some scholarship, linked to wider debates in anthropology, has increasingly emphasized the state as a primarily cultural artifact, and focuses on how symbolism plays a primary role in state formation. Most explicitly, some studies emphasize how the creation of national identification and citizenship were crucial to state formation. The state then is not simply a military or economic authority, but also includes cultural components creating consent by people by giving them rights and shared belonging.

=== Emulation and institutions ===
Scholars have emphasized emulation and learning as a driver behind the diffusion of state-like institutions. Chin-Hao Huang and Dave Kang argue that state-like institutions diffused to Korea and Japan due to emulation of Chinese institutions. According to Philip Gorski, the Reformation led to the diffusion of state-like organizational forms (such as communal surveillance, incarceration, and bureaucracies). Anna Grzymala-Busse notes that both universities and churches provided organizational templates that influenced European state-formation. Medieval churches were bureaucratized, with notions of office, hierarchy and an esprit de corps among clerical cadres.

Sverre Bagge has argued that Christianity was a key component in European state-formation, as the "Church created permanent institutions which strengthened the power of the king." He also argues that the Church played an active role in legitimizing monarchies and kingdoms as systems of government in Western Christendom.

Some scholars have argued that state formation occurred through an ideological revolution, as a preference for personalized rule shifted towards depersonalized, rational-legal administration.

=== Marriage and dynastic politics ===
Sverre Bagge argues that the key factors behind the consolidation of European kingdoms were marriage alliance and hereditary succession. He notes that kingdoms frequently failed to conquer one another through warfare, but ended up merging with one another when marriage ties led the king of one kingdom to become the rightful heir to a second kingdom. He cites as examples: the union of Denmark and Norway under King Oluf of Denmark; King James VI of Scotland inheriting the English throne; and dynastic marriages in Spanish kingdoms ultimately leading to the union between Isabella of Castile and Ferdinand of Aragon in 1469.

=== Outside Europe ===
While modern states existed without European influence around the world before colonialism, post-colonial state formation has received the most significant attention. While warfare is primary in theories about state formation in Europe, the development of the international norm of non-interventionism means that other processes of state formation have become prominent outside Europe (including colonial imposition, assimilation, borrowing, and some internal political processes. John W. Meyer's World Society Theory contends that the state form was exported from Europe, institutionalized in the United Nations, and gradually the modern nation-state became the basis for both those in power and those challenging power. In addition, because many of the early modern states like the United Kingdom and France had significant empires, their institutional templates became standard for application globally.

Africa

According to academics on state formation in Africa, most notably Jeffrey Herbst, in his States and Power in Africa: Comparative Lessons in Authority and Control (2000) many contemporary African states lack the empirical qualities of states found in their counterparts in the developed world. This is due to the differences in the state building experience between Europe and Africa. Statebuilding in Europe was characterized by the threat of territorial wars, as such states formed as a by product of ruler's efforts in preparing for and waging war. As states in Africa were formed out of decolonization and born in an international system that respected the sovereignty of international borders, this meant that the threat of territorial conquest, which highlighted the European statebuilding experience, was absent from Africa. As such, ruling elite in Africa did not have the impetus to develop strong and effective institutional structures as the survival of the state was guaranteed by the international community. In doing so this led to the proliferation of weak states in Africa, with only juridical statehood, in reality they lacked effectiveness and legitimacy.

Latin America

Taking the work on Europe by Tilly as a reference, and Tilly's thesis that wars made states, Miguel A. Centeno argues that Latin American states were from the outset comparatively weak vis-à-vis European states due to type of war – internal wars – that prevailed in Latin America.

A different analysis of state formation in Latin America and contrast to Europe is provided by Sebastián Mazzuca. Mazzuca argues that, in contrast to Europe, trade, not war, created the countries of Latin America. But trade created weaker countries than war. A key theoretical claim of Mazzuca's is that state formation (border demarcation) was incompatible with state building (capacity creation) in Latin America because the rush to incorporate the region into global commerce induced the emergence of countries with dysfunctional territories, i.e., combinations of subnational regions that in the long run proved economically unviable. This claim complements and refines the usual ideas that attribute all forms of economic and social backwardness in Latin America to colonial institutions.

== See also ==
- Civil society
- Global governance
- State of nature

== Bibliography ==
- Abramson, Scott F (2017). "The Economic Origins of the Territorial State". International Organization. 71 (1): 97–130. doi:10.1017/S0020818316000308. S2CID 22432480.
- Axtmann, Roland (July 2004). "The State of the State: The Model of the Modern State and Its Contemporary Transformation". International Political Science Review. 25 (3): 259–279. doi:10.1177/0192512104043016. S2CID 145379964.
- Barkey, Karen; Parikh, Sunita (August 1991). "Comparative Perspectives on the State". Annual Review of Sociology. 17 (1): 523–549. doi:10.1146/annurev.soc.17.1.523.
- Blanton, Richard; Fargher, Lane (2008). Collective Action in the Formation of Pre-Modern States. New York: Springer. OCLC 209984839.
- Carneiro, Robert L. (21 August 1970). "A Theory of the Origin of the State: Traditional theories of state origins are considered and rejected in favor of a new ecological hypothesis". Science. 169 (3947): 733–738. Bibcode:1970Sci...169..733C. doi:10.1126/science.169.3947.733. PMID 17820299. S2CID 11536431.
- Claessen, Henri J.M.; Skalnik, Peter (1978). "The Early State: Theories and Hypotheses". In Henri J.M. Claessen; Peter Skalnik (eds.). The Early State. New York: Mouton Publishers. pp. 3–29. ISBN 978-90-279-7904-9. OCLC 4781474.
- Cohen, Ronald (1978). "State Origins: A Reappraisal". In Henri J.M. Claessen; Peter Skalnik (eds.). The Early State. New York: Mouton Publishers. pp. 31–75. ISBN 978-90-279-7904-9. OCLC 4781474.
- Ejiogu, Ec (December 2011). "State Building in the Niger Basin in the Common Era and Beyond, 1000–Mid 1800s: The Case of Yorubaland". Journal of Asian and African Studies. 46 (6): 593–614. doi:10.1177/0021909611405831. S2CID 145180641.
- Gross, Feliks (1999). Citizenship and Ethnicity: The Growth and Development of a Democratic Multiethnic Institution. Greenwood Publishing Group. ISBN 978-0-313-30932-8.
- Haas, Jonathan (1981). "Class Conflict and the State in the New World". In Grant D. Jones; Robert R. Kautz (eds.). The Transition to Statehood in the New World. Cambridge: Cambridge University Press. pp. 80–104.
- Haas, Jonathan (1982). The Evolution of the Prehistoric State. New York: Columbia University Press. ISBN 978-0-231-05338-9. OCLC 8171126.
- Herbst, Jeffrey (1990). "War and the State in Africa". International Security. 14 (4): 117–139. doi:10.2307/2538753. JSTOR 2538753. S2CID 153804691.
- Kaldor, Nicholas (1963). "Will underdeveloped countries learn to tax?". Foreign Affairs. 41 (2): 410–419. doi:10.2307/20029626. JSTOR 20029626.
- Krohn-Hansen, Christian; Nustad, Knut G. (2005). "Introduction". In Christian Krohn-Hansen; Knut G. Nustad (eds.). State Formation: Anthropological Perspectives. London: Pluto Press. pp. 3–26. OCLC 815686763.
- Marcus, Joyce; Feinman, Gary M. (1998). "Introduction". In Gary M. Feinman; Joyce Marcus (eds.). Archaic States. Santa Fe, New Mexico: School of American Research Press. pp. 3–13. OCLC 38120578.
- Olson, Mancur (1993). "Dictatorship, Democracy, and Development". American Political Science Review. 87 (3): 567–576. doi:10.2307/2938736. JSTOR 2938736.
- Painter, Joe; Jeffrey, Alex (2009). Political Geography. London: SAGE Publications Ltd. pp. 22–24. ISBN 978-1-4129-0138-3.
- Samuels, David (2017). Comparative Politics. Pearson. ISBN 978-0-13-456267-4.
- Sandeford, David S. (2018). "Organizational complexity and demographic scale in primary state". Royal Society Open Science. 5 (5) 171137. Bibcode:2018RSOS....571137S. doi:10.1098/rsos.171137. PMC 5990841. PMID 29892345.
- Service, Elman R. (1978). "Classical and Modern Theories on the Origins of Government". In Ronald Cohen; Elman R. Service (eds.). Origins of the State: The Anthropology of Political Evolution. Philadelphia, PA: ISHI. pp. 21–34. ISBN 978-0-915980-84-0. OCLC 3558908.
- Southall, Aidan (October 1974). "State Formation in Africa". Annual Review of Anthropology. 3 (1): 153–165. doi:10.1146/annurev.an.03.100174.001101.
- Spencer, Charles S.; Redmond, Elsa M. (1 October 2004). "Primary State Formation in Mesoamerica". Annual Review of Anthropology. 33 (1): 173–199. doi:10.1146/annurev.anthro.33.070203.143823.
- Spruyt, Hendrik (June 2002). "The Origins, Development, and Possible Decline of the Modern State". Annual Review of Political Science. 5 (1): 127–149. doi:10.1146/annurev.polisci.5.101501.145837. S2CID 145637947.
- Thompson, William R.; Rasler, Karen (February 1999). "War, the Military Revolution(s) Controversy, and Army Expansion: A Test of Two Explanations of Historical Influences on European State Making". Comparative Political Studies. 32 (1): 3–31. doi:10.1177/0010414099032001001. S2CID 153973953.
- Tilly, Charles (February 1982). "Warmaking and Statemaking as Organized Crime". University of Michigan. CRSO Working Paper #256. hdl:2027.42/51028.
- Tilly, Charles (1990). Coercion, Capital, and European States, AD 990–1992.
- Wimmer, Andreas; Feinstein, Yuval (October 2010). "The Rise of the Nation-State across the World, 1816 to 2001". American Sociological Review. 75 (5): 764–790. CiteSeerX 10.1.1.690.9400. doi:10.1177/0003122410382639. S2CID 10075481.
- Wright, Henry T. (October 1977). "Recent Research on the Origin of the State". Annual Review of Anthropology. 6 (1): 379–397. doi:10.1146/annurev.an.06.100177.002115.
- Wright, Henry T. (October 2006). "Early State Dynamics as Political Experiment". Journal of Anthropological Research. 62 (3): 305–319. doi:10.3998/jar.0521004.0062.301. JSTOR 20371027. S2CID 144973163.
