= Elman Service =

American anthropologist

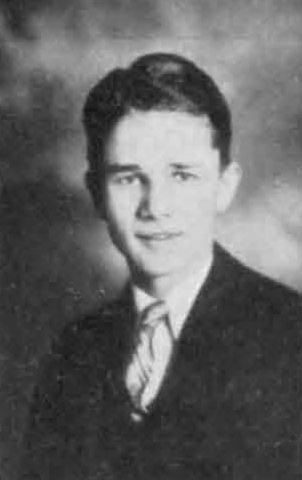
- Service in the Tecumseh High School yearbook, 1933
- Born: May 18, 1915; Tecumseh, Michigan
- Died: November 14, 1996 (aged 81); Santa Barbara, California
- Education: Columbia University; University of Michigan
- Scientific career
- Fields: Cultural anthropology
- Military Career
- Allegiance: Spanish Republic; United States of America
- Branch: International Brigades; United States Army
- Unit: The "Abraham Lincoln" XV International Brigade
- Conflicts: Spanish Civil War; World War II

Elman Rogers Service (May 18, 1915 – November 14, 1996) was an American cultural anthropologist.

== Biography ==
He was born on May 18, 1915, in Tecumseh, Michigan and died on November 14, 1996, in Santa Barbara, California. He earned a bachelor's degree in 1941 from the University of Michigan. He earned a Ph.D. in anthropology from Columbia University in 1951 and taught there from 1949 to 1953. From there, Service went back to the University of Michigan to teach from 1953 until 1969. He later taught at the University of California at Santa Barbara from 1969 to 1985, when he retired.

During his time studying at the University of Michigan, Service joined the Abraham Lincoln Brigade of the Republican Faction in Spain to fight against the victorious Nationalist Faction of General Francisco Franco during the 1936–1939 Spanish Civil War. He also fought in the 1941–1945 World War II for the United States Army.

== Work ==
Elman Service researched Latin American Indian ethnology, cultural evolution, and theory and method in ethnology. He studied cultural evolution in Paraguay and studied cultures in Latin America and the Caribbean. These studies led to his theories about social systems and the rise of the state as a system of political organization.

He was the Secretary-Treasurer of the American Ethnological Society and a member of the American Anthropological Association.

== Theories ==
In 1962, Elman Service published his four classifications of the stages of social evolution and political organizations: band, tribe, chiefdom, and state.

He also developed the "managerial benefits" theory, which states that chiefdom-like society developed because of the apparent benefits of centralized leadership. The leader provides benefits to their followers, which, over time, become more complex, benefiting the whole chiefdom society. This keeps the leader in power, and allows the bureaucratic organization to grow.

Service also advanced an integration theory. He believed that early civilizations were not stratified based on property and unequal access to resources, but instead based on unequal political power. He believed there were no true class conflicts, but only power struggles between the political elite in early civilizations. The integration part of this theory was that monuments were created through volunteering, not the leaders forcing it upon the populace.

Elman Service also coined what he called “Law of Evolutionary Potential” in relation to cultural evolution. This law posited that the more specialized and adapted a form in a given evolutionary stage, the smaller its potential for passing on to the next stage.

=== Books by Elman Service ===
- Tobati: Paraguayan Town (1954)
- A Profile of Primitive Culture (1958)
- Evolution and Culture (with M.D. Sahlins) (1960)
- Primitive Social Organization (1962)
- Profiles in Ethnology (1963)
- The Hunters (1966)
- Cultural Evolutionism (1971)
- Origins of the State and Civilization (1975)
- A Century of Controversy, Ethnological Issues from 1860 to 1960 (1985)

== Bibliography ==
- https://web.archive.org/web/20060616094717/http://bruceowen.com/emciv/34104s15.htm
- http://www.britannica.com/eb/article-9066882
- http://www.indiana.edu/~ancient/6notes.html
- https://web.archive.org/web/20050118101236/http://www.le.ac.uk/archaeology/rug/AR210/circles/project/technol.htm
- https://web.archive.org/web/20051102130808/http://www.mnsu.edu/emuseum/information/biography/pqrst/service_elman.html
- https://web.archive.org/web/20060525075948/http://www.nmnh.si.edu/naa/fa/american_ethnological_society.pdf
