= Michael Hechter =

American sociologist

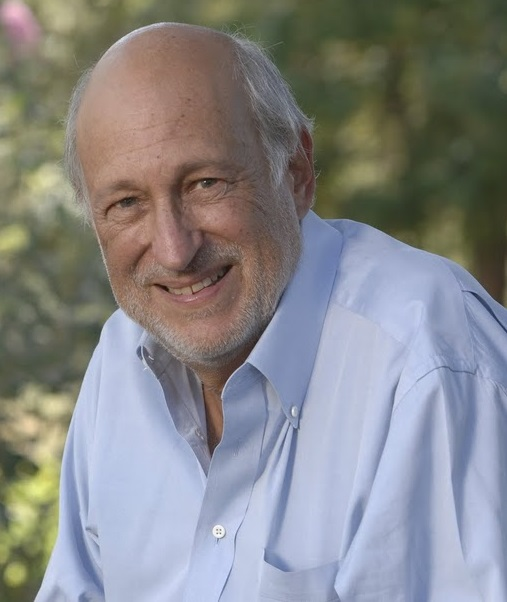
- Born: Los Angeles, California

Academic background
- Education: A.B., Ph.D.
- Alma mater: Columbia University
- Doctoral advisor: Immanuel Wallerstein

Academic work
- Institutions: University of Washington; University of Arizona; University of Oxford; Arizona State University; University of Copenhagen
- Notable students: Satoshi Kanazawa; William I. Brustein
- Website: michaelhechter.wordpress.com

Michael Hechter is an American sociologist and Foundation Professor of Political Science at Arizona State University. He is also Emeritus Professor of Sociology at the University of Washington.

Hechter first became known for his research in comparative-historical analysis. His book Internal Colonialism: The Celtic Fringe in British National Development, 1536-1966 (1975; 1998) presented a social structural analysis of nationalism – in contrast to then-popular cultural explanations of the phenomenon—and was one of the first such studies to employ multivariate statistical analysis. It was deemed one of the best books of the 20th century by the International Sociological Association.

Subsequently, he began to deploy rational choice theory to explain a series of macrosociological problems, including nationalism, state formation, collective action and social order. These issues are analyzed in The Microfoundations of Macrosociology (1983), Principles of Group Solidarity (1987), Containing Nationalism (2000), Alien Rule (2013), Rational Choice Sociology (2019), and The Genesis of Rebellion (2020), co-authored with Steven Pfaff. A collection of his contributions in this vein can be found in Rational Choice Sociology (2019).

Hechter is a fellow of the American Academy of Arts and Sciences (since 2004) and an elected member of the Society for Comparative Research. He was a fellow at the Russell Sage Foundation, and twice a fellow at the Center for Advanced Study in the Behavioral Sciences at Stanford University.

== Early life and education ==
Hechter is the son of Oscar Hechter, a prominent steroid biochemist, and Gertrude Hechter, an artist. He was born in Los Angeles, California and raised in Worcester, Massachusetts, where he attended the Putney School and graduated from Worcester Academy. He received an A.B in 1966 and a Ph.D. in sociology in 1972, both from Columbia University.

== Career ==
Hechter joined the Department of Sociology at the University of Washington in 1970, where he stayed until 1984. He then took a professorship at the University of Arizona where he remained for a full decade before moving to the joining the University of Oxford as a fellow of New College and a University Lecturer in Sociology

From 1996 to 1999, Hechter returned to the United States and resumed teaching at the University of Arizona. In 1999, he rejoined the sociology department at the University of Washington, becoming Emeritus Professor in 2005. He then joined Arizona State University as a Foundation Professor in School of Global Studies, later becoming a Foundation Professor of Political Science in 2013 and a core faculty member of the Center for the Study of Social Dynamics and Complexity. From 2008 to 2009, he was the Director of School of Global Studies at ASU. He was also a professor of sociology at the University of Copenhagen from 2015 to 2017.

Hechter currently serves on the editorial boards of Man and the Economy, Ethnopolitics, Nations and Nationalism and Legal Theory.

Hechter has edited a number of special issues of journals on core sociological matters. "Internal Colonialism in Comparative Perspective", (with John Stone) appeared in Ethnic and Racial Studies in 1979. He produced an issue of Theory and Society in 1994 on "Theoretical Implications of the Demise of State Socialism" with Iván Szelényi. In 1995, he was in charge of a Special Issue of the American Journal of Sociology on "Prediction in the Social Sciences." "Legitimacy in the Modern World," came out in the American Behavioral Scientist (2009). "Center-Periphery Bargaining in an Age of Democracy," (with David Siroky and Sean Mueller) appeared in the Swiss Political Science Review (2016).

== Research and work ==
=== Internal colonialism ===
Hechter's first book, Internal Colonialism: the Celtic Fringe in British National Development 1536-1966, published in 1975, was selected as one of the Best Books of the Century by the International Sociological Association in 2000. An Italian translation was published in 1979. The book argued that colonialism was hardly limited to overseas colonies. Internal colonialism arose in many Western European countries in the course of state-building. England had conquered Wales in 1536, added Scotland with the Treaty of Union in 1707, and incorporated Ireland in 1801. The concept of internal colonialism was first used by Russian populists to describe the exploitation of peasants by urban classes. Subsequently, it was adopted by Antonio Gramsci and others to characterize the persisting underdevelopment of certain Russian and Italian regions. Internal Colonialism, however, limited the term to core states that extended their control over culturally distinct peripheries. The book presented two separate but related arguments. The first was couched at the level of regions. This argument holds that the lack of political sovereignty characteristic of internal colonies limited their economic welfare and threatened their cultural integrity. The peripheral population is denied the privilege and responsibility of determining its own political fate. The second argument focused on individuals rather than regions and asserts that culturally distinct identities remain salient among the members of groups subject to a cultural division of labor.

=== The cultural division of labor ===
His 1978 paper "Group formation and the cultural division of labor", published in the American Journal of Sociology, highlighted two primary types of group formation – based on principles of hierarchy and segmentation—with implications for social stratification in any society. This theme has recently been elaborated in a number of recent articles by political scientists on horizontal inequality, as well as Hechter's co-authored 2016 article on "Ethnicity, Class and Civil War."

=== Nationalism ===
Hechter's work on nationalism addresses three questions: its timing, reasons for the political salience of cultural distinctions, and the consequences of alien rule. His 2000 book, Containing Nationalism explains why nationalist political movements only tended to arise since the 19th century. This is due to the recent increase in direct rule — centralized political control — in most advanced states. The rise of direct rule threatened traditional authorities in the peripheral regions of multicultural states; in response, they had good reason to mobilize their dependents under the flag of nationalism to challenge the legitimacy of core state rule. This book is translated into Simplified Chinese.

In 2004, "From Class to Culture" in the American Journal of Sociology offered an explanation for the heightened importance of cultural politics in advanced societies. It argues that the growth of direct rule – as indicated by the increasing centralization of state power and the development of policies promoting welfare expenditure and specific cultural policies—with respect to immigration, same sex marriage, abortion, and so forth—tends to increase the salience of cultural politics at the expense of its class alternative.

Alien Rule (2013) is about tensions that arise in societies when the ruling authorities are not themselves members of that collectivity, commonly giving rise to nationalist movements. The book describes the conditions that have made – and might continue to make – alien rule legitimate in the eyes of the ruled. It therefore explores the possibility that "good alien governance may be better than bad native governance", and will, if it is to succeed, be a question of whether it is able to "effectively produce the right kinds of collective goods, and allocate these goods fairly to the ruled".

=== Sociological rational choice theory ===
In the 1980s, Hechter's interest in social theory led him to consider the wedding sociology with Rational Choice Theory. The first public airing of this work appeared in The Microfoundations of Macrosociology (1983). In 1987, Hechter wrote Principles of Group Solidarity, which argued that the solidarity of any group is determined by the conjunction of individuals' dependence on the group for access to collective goods, as well as the group's capacity to monitor and sanction members for their compliance to corporate obligations. This volume was selected by Choice as an Outstanding Academic Book in 1988 and was a finalist for the American Sociological Association's Distinguished Contribution to Scholarship Award. This book is also translated into Japanese. Beyond that, Hechter has written extensively on a variety of social phenomena. Rational Choice Sociology (2019) compiles some of his most important papers on theory, collective action and social order.

=== The value of children and grandchildren ===
Hechter's interest in rational choice led him to consider the role of values and other motivational states in determining behavior. In this context, he wrote about the value of children and grandchildren. In 1994, he co-authored 'A theory of the value of children' in Demography. This article explores why people in advanced societies continue to have children even when the cost of so doing far exceeds their economic value to them. The argument hinges on the primacy of the behavioral assumption of uncertainty reduction. The authors review the inadequacies in the prevailing literature based on prevailing normative and rational choice explanations. The theory is explored from a number of angles including that of 'marital solidarity enhancements', and is related to the then-extant empirical literature. In a subsequent article, 'A Theory of the Value of Grandchildren' in Rationality and Society, published in 2008, the theme of uncertainty reduction is explored from a different angle. Since grandparents cannot know the length of their own life course, grandparents invest differentially in the children of those children who they deem most likely to support them in old age.

Hechter's engagement in value theory in general, and the measurement of values in particular, is shown in yet another paper, 'Prediction vs Explanation in the Measurement of Values' in the European Sociological Review, where rational action is explored from different measurement angles. In taking the role of values seriously as motivating factors in assessing social behavior, the authors construct a parallel factorial survey method to the more commonly used descriptive survey in value measurements. This method is based on an indirect form of measurement (factorial surveys) in that respondents have to make choices about a series of hypothetical vignettes, rather than responding to direct questions.

=== Collective action ===
In his 2020 book, The Genesis of Rebellion: Governance, Grievance and Mutiny in the Age of Sail, co-authored with Steven Pfaff, mutiny is analyzed as a manifestation of collective action and contentious politics. The book uses narrative evidence and statistical analysis to trace the processes by which governance failed, social order decayed, and Royal Navy seamen mobilized. The findings highlight the complexities of governance, showing that it was not mere deprivation, but how seamen interpreted that deprivation, which stoked the grievances that motivated rebellion. Using the Age of Sail as a lens to examine topics still relevant today - what motivates people to rebel against deprivation and poor governance, the book contributes to understanding the emergence of populism and rejection of the establishment. In 2021, The Genesis of Rebellion: won the Allan Sharlin Memorial Prize of the Social Science History Association for the best book in social science history in 2020.

== Awards and honors ==
- 1988-1989 - Visiting Scholar, Russell Sage Foundation
- 1990-1991 - Fellow, Center for Advanced Study in the Behavioral Sciences
- 1992 - Elected to the Sociological Research Association
- 2001 - Elected member of Society for Comparative Research
- 2004 - Elected Fellow, American Academy of Arts & Sciences
- 2011-2012 - Fellow, Center for Advanced Study in the Behavioral Sciences
- 2019 - Top 100 Most-Cited Political Scientists, The Political Science 400

== Bibliography ==
=== Books ===
- Internal Colonialism: The Celtic Fringe in British National Development 1536. Berkeley: University of California Press (1975; 1998), ISBN 0-7100-7988-5
- Principles of Group Solidarity. Berkeley: University of California Press (1987)
- Containing Nationalism. Oxford: Oxford University Press (2000)
- Alien Rule. New York: Cambridge University Press (2013)
- Rational Choice Sociology: Essays on Theory, Collective Action, and Social Order. Cheltenham, UK: Edward Elgar (2019)
- The Genesis of Rebellion: Governance, Grievance and Mutiny in the Age of Sail (with Steven Pfaff). New York: Cambridge University Press (2020).

=== Edited books ===
- The Microfoundations of Macrosociology. Philadelphia: Temple University Press (1983)
- Social Institutions: Their Emergence, Maintenance, and Effects, co-editor (with Karl-Dieter Opp and Reinhard Wippler). New York: Aldine de Gruyter; Berlin: Walter de Gruyter (1990)
- The Origin of Values, co-editor (with Lynn Nadel and Richard E. Michod). New York: Aldine de Gruyter 1993
- Social Norms, co-editor (with Karl-Dieter Opp). New York: Russell Sage Foundation (2001, 2005)
- Theories of Social Order, (with Christine Horne). Stanford: Stanford University Press, (2003; 2009)

=== Articles ===
- Internal Colonialism Revisited, in Hearn, Sheila G. (ed.), Cencrastus No. 10, Autumn 1982, pp. 8 – 11, ISSN 0264-0856
