= Anna Leander =

Sociologist and political scientist

Anna Leander is a sociologist and political scientist. Leander is currently a professor at the Graduate Institute of International and Development Studies in Geneva. She previously taught at the Copenhagen Business School and the Inst. de Relacoes Internacionais, Pontifical Catholic University of Rio de Janeiro. Leander is well known for her work in critical security studies and international political sociology. Theoretically, Leander has played an important role in bringing the work of Pierre Bourdieu into conversation with the discipline of International Relations, as well as more recently working with materialist and pragmatist sociologies. Empirically, much of her work focuses on the contours of private military contractors, drones, and the politics of knowledge in a digital context. Leander has supported the development of International Political Sociology as an editor, through engagement with professional organizations and research evaluation as well as through her investment with education. Anna Leander was associate editor of International Political Sociology until 2017 and is currently associate editor of Security Dialogue and Contexto Internacional and co-editor of the Routledge Series in Private Security Studies. Leander has served on the Norwegian and Swedish Research Councils, numerous research evaluation boards as well as on the advisory boards of DIIS, the Danish Institute for International Studies and the German Institute for Global and Area Studies. She was a co-founder of the International Political Sociology section of the International Studies Association, she co-developed/co-directed the International Business and Politics Program of the Copenhagen Business School, and she has supported/supervised numerous doctoral projects.

== Biography ==
Leander is of Franco-Swedish origins and began her education at the Institut d’Études Politiques in Paris before pursuing graduate studies at the London School of Economics, London and receiving her PhD from the European University Institute, Florence in 1997. She taught as assistant professor at the Central European University in Budapest between 1995 and 2000, before becoming a research fellow at the Copenhagen Peace Research Institute, Associate Professor of the University of Southern Denmark, and finally moving to Copenhagen Business School in 2006 where she was promoted to Professor in 2009. Since 2018 she has been a Full Professor at the Graduate Institute of International and Development Studies, Geneva. She has also held vising fellowships at numerous institutions including the Hanse Wissenschafts Kolleg and the Judith Reppy Institute for Peace and Conflict Studies (Cornell University).
