= Hendrik Spruyt =

Dutch-American political scientist

Hendrik Spruyt is a Dutch-American political scientist. He is the Emeritus Norman Dwight Harris Professor of International Relations at Northwestern University. He is known for his research on state formation and sovereignty. Spruyt has advanced arguments for the emergence of the modern state that emphasize institutionalist aspects (as opposed to security and economic explanations).

In 1983, he obtained a Doctorandus from the University of Leiden, School of Law, and in 1991, he obtained his Ph. D in Political Science from the University of California, San Diego.

== Publications ==
- The World Imagined: Collective Beliefs and Political Order in the Sinocentric, Islamic and Southeast Asian International Societies (Cambridge University Press, 2020)
- Global Horizons: An Introduction to International Relations (University of Toronto Press, 2009)
- Ending Empire: Contested Sovereignty and Territorial Partition (Cornell University Press, 2005)
- The Sovereign State and Its Competitors: An Analysis of Systems Change (Princeton University Press, 1994)
