= William I. Brustein =

American historian

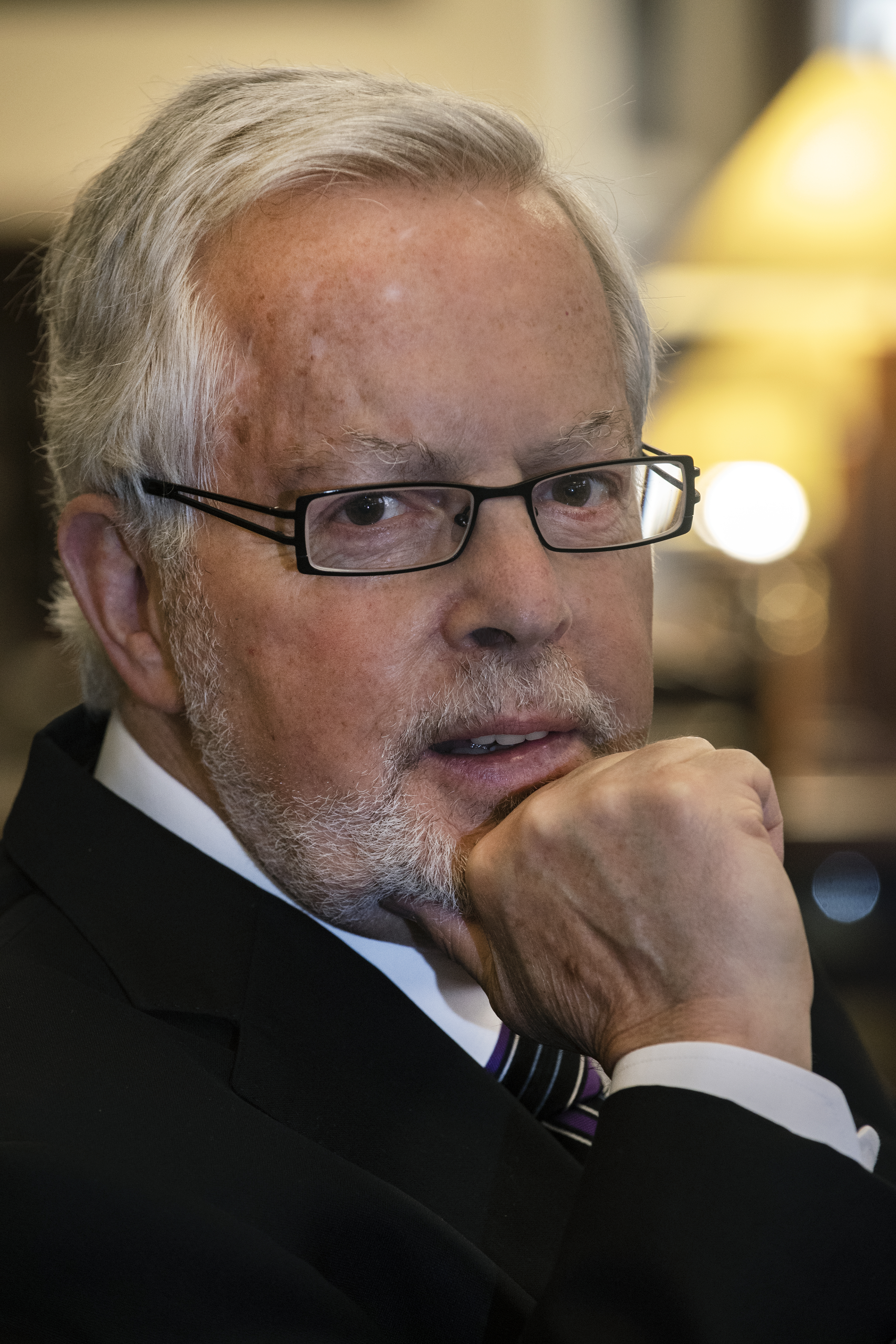
Dr. William I. Brustein

William I. Brustein is Professor Emeritus at West Virginia University, having recently stepped down as Vice President for Global Strategies and International Affairs and Eberly Family Distinguished Professor of History. Previously, he was the Vice Provost for Global Strategies and International Affairs at The Ohio State University, as well as the Associate Provost for International Affairs and Director of International Programs and Studies at the University of Illinois at Urbana-Champaign. Brustein has spent much of his administrative career focused on international education. He has published widely in the areas of political extremism and ethnic/religious/racial prejudice.

== Education ==
Brustein has a bachelor's degree in political science from the University of Connecticut, a master's degree in international studies from the Johns Hopkins School of Advanced International Studies, and a PhD in sociology from the University of Washington.

== Honors and awards ==
In April 2022, Brustein was awarded the Global Citizen Award by Texas Tech University. This award is presented to a distinguished individual who has made significant contributions toward internationalization of higher education.

In February 2013, Brustein was awarded the Charles Klasek Award for outstanding service to the field of international education administration by the Association of International Education Administrators.

He was named Alumni Professor of International Studies at the University of Illinois at Urbana-Champaign. Brustein was named a University of Utah Faculty Fellow (1984-1985), a Fulbright Fellow (1988-1989), and the McKnight Distinguished University Professor at the University of Minnesota (2000). He was elected to the Sociological Research Association in 1996. He also has been recognized in Marquis Who’s Who in the World, in America, and in American Education.

Brustein has also received a Morse Amoco Award for Outstanding Contributions to Higher Education (1993-1994), a University College/Continuing Education Distinguished Teaching award (1996), and admittance into the Academy of Distinguished Teachers (1998), all from the University of Minnesota.

Brustein is an inaugural member of the National Academy for International Education, the first honorary society and think tank for international education leaders.

== Publications ==
=== Books ===
Brustein has published widely in the areas of political extremism and ethnic/religious/racial prejudice. His 1996 book The Logic of Evil: The Social Origins of the Nazi Party, 1925-1933 was the winner of the 1997 James S. Coleman Distinguished Contribution to Rational-Choice Scholarship from the American Sociological Association, Rational-Choice Section. His publications include:

- with Luke Gramith: Anti-Semitism without Jews, Germany, France, and the U.S.: Phantom Enemies (Palgrave Critical Studies of Antisemitism and Racism) (London: Palgrave Macmillan). 2024. ISBN 9783031557552
- with Louisa Roberts: The Socialism of Fools?: Leftist Origins of Modern Anti-Semitism (Cambridge and New York: Cambridge University Press), 2015. ISBN 9780521870856
- Roots of Hate: Anti-Semitism in Europe Before the Holocaust (Cambridge and New York: Cambridge University Press), 2003. ISBN 0521774780
- The Logic of Evil: The Social Origins of the Nazi Party, 1925-1933 (New Haven: Yale University Press), 1996. ISBN 0300074328
- The Social Origins of Political Regionalism: France, 1849 to 1981 (Berkeley: University of California Press), 1988. ISBN 0520061551
