= Intercultural intelligence =

Interculturalism

Intercultural intelligence, or ICI, is a term that is used for the capability to function effectively in culturally diverse settings and consists of different dimensions (metacognitive, cognitive, motivational and behavioral) which are correlated to effectiveness in global environment (cultural judgement and decision making, cultural adaptation and task performance in culturally diverse settings). Intercultural intelligence differs from cultural intelligence in that it is based from the belief in interculturalism while CQ is based from the belief in multiculturalism. The term was first used in 2006 in response to the qualities observed in international executives that enabled them to succeed globally.

== Basics ==
In a culturally diverse society, his or her intercultural intelligence is used to expand on one’s understanding of the attitudes and knowledge base of one’s own culture as well as those of the dominant cultural groups within a society. In a global society, the demand for intercultural intelligence is increasing as the world become more global throughout the many different sectors of our lives. The theory of ICI disagrees with the assumptions of national cultures and instead suggest that there are individual “self-cultures” and corporate “self-cultures”. This can be seen today where an Indian is born and raised in Kuwait, their native tongue is English, and they work for a Korean company. Cross-cultural communication depends on much more than just language, culture plays a significant role. Language without ICI can lead to false cultural understanding and can actually become a disadvantage in communication.

Understanding different worldviews have a significant impact on one's ICI. People with high ICI's have an adept understanding of the Honor and Shame, Guilt and Innocence, and Power and Fear worldviews. Intercultural sensitivity involves individuals ability to experience relevant cultural differences while intercultural intelligence involves the ability to interpret someone’s unfamiliar and ambiguous gestures.

== In business ==
Intercultural Intelligence is used in the business world to bridge the cultural divide and avoid misunderstandings that affect business. The application of ICI has been found to reduce the chances of clashes and other harmful incidences that usually affect productivity and feelings towards work. Its application is also found in business coaching as a way for cross-cultural coaching to be done in a way that overcomes miscommunication between different cultures. As businesses become more international, so do the interactions among their multi-cultural employees that are managed across cultural lines.

== In education ==
ICI has been integrated into secondary and undergraduate schooling in the UAE. In the culturally diverse country of the Emirates, there have been implementation of courses that teach ICI in response for the voiced need of it in such an environment. It is starting to take notice that the current education system is done in a monocultural way while the world is becoming more multicultural. If students are more interculturally sensitive to members belonging to other cultures, this could aide in preventing ethnocentric attitudes. University and college faculties themselves are also going through the process of making their teacher more global through ICI. Dr Karen Magro states that teachers are finding that with the increasing diversity, the roles of teachers are widening to include the role of cultural guides and facilitators in the classroom.

== See also ==
- Intercultural communication
- Intercultural competence
- Intelligence cycle
- Organisational culture
- Cultural competence
- Interculturalism
- Intercultural relations
