= LCI =

LCI may refer to:

== Christian denominations ==
- Lutheran Church - International, a denomination of Evangelical Catholic churchmanship
- Lighthouse Chapel International, a church based in Ghana

== Organizations ==
- La Chaîne Info, a French television news channel
- LCI Communications, a defunct Canadian telecommunications company
- Lease Corporation International, an airliner lessor based in Dublin, Ireland
- London Clubs International, a British gambling company
- Lions Clubs International, an international service organization based in Chicago Illinois, United States

== Educational institutions ==
- LaSalle College International, in Jakarta and Surabaya, Indonesia
- Leibniz Center for Informatics, in Germany
- Lethbridge Collegiate Institute, in Alberta, Canada
- Liquid Crystal Institute, at Kent State University, Ohio, United States
- Lisgar Collegiate Institute, in Ottawa, Ontario, Canada
- Louisiana Culinary Institute, in Baton Rouge, Louisiana, United States

== Other ==
- Laguna Copperplate Inscription, in the National Museum of the Philippines
- Landing Craft Infantry, a US Navy hull classification, in use from 1941 to 1949
- Life Cycle Impulse, in automobile manufacturing, a BMW term for facelift or update to existing series
- Life cycle inventory, part of a life cycle assessment
- Liga Comunista Internacionalista (Internationalist Communist League (Portugal)), former Trotskyist party in Portugal
- Liquid contact indicator, an indicator in the form of a sticker that changes color after contact with liquids
- Loaded chamber indicator, a firearm safety device

== See also ==
- LC1 (disambiguation)
- LCL (disambiguation)
- ICL (disambiguation)
- ICI (disambiguation)
- LCII (disambiguation)
