= LC1 =

LC1 or LC-1 may refer to:

- Launch Complex 1 (disambiguation)
  - Cape Canaveral Air Force Station Launch Complex 1, an American rocket launch site
  - Xichang Launch Complex 1, part of the Xichang Satellite Launch Center
  - Gagarin's Start, a Russian Space launch site
- SpaceX Landing Complex 1, Space Coast, Florida, USA
- N&W LC-1, an electric railway locomotive
- Lancia LC1, a sport car
- LC1 (classification), a Paralympic cycling classification

== See also ==
- LCI (disambiguation)
- LCL (disambiguation)
- ICI (disambiguation)
- ICL (disambiguation)
- LC (disambiguation)
