= Cultural competence in healthcare =

Healthcare services that meet the needs of diverse cultures

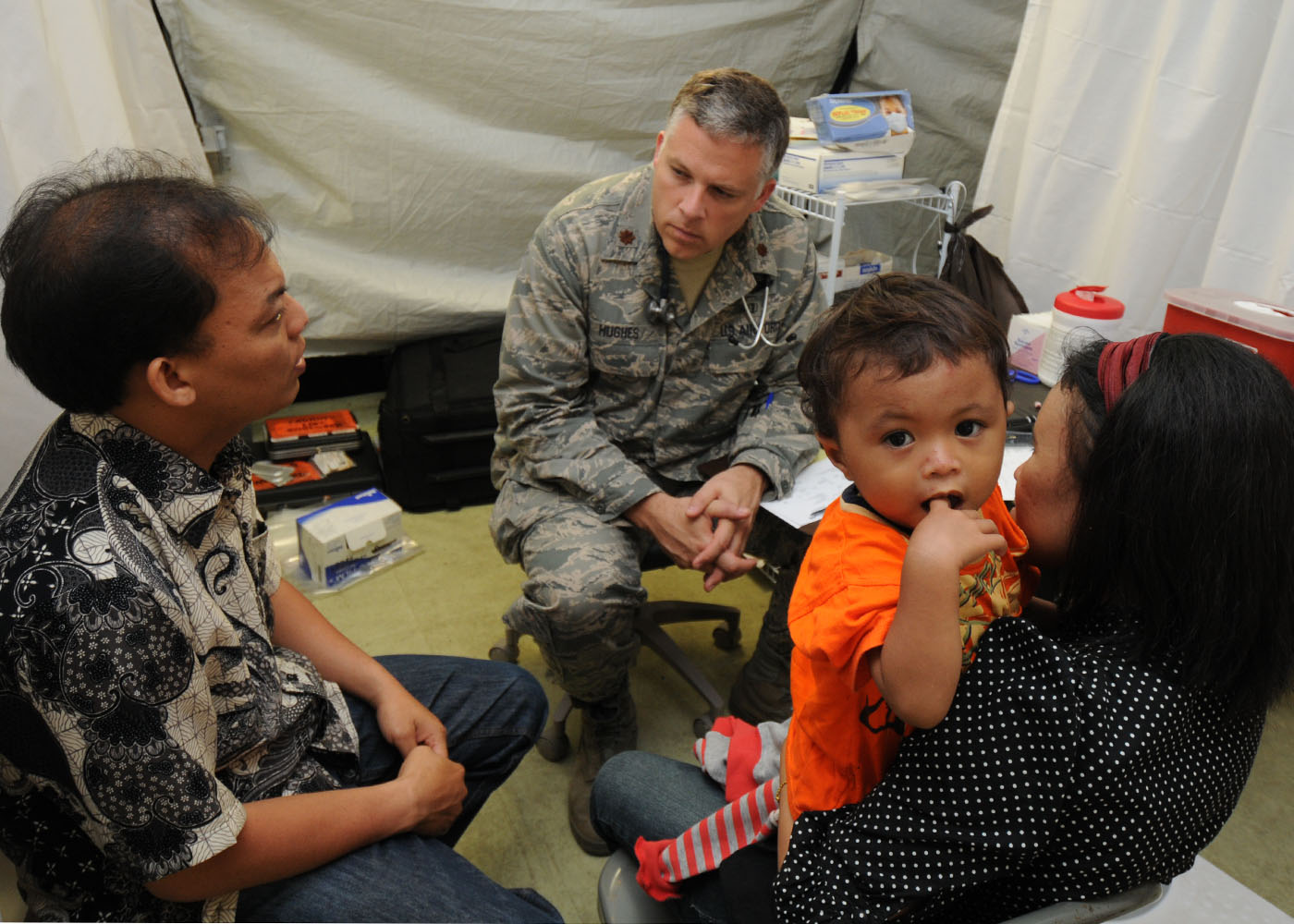
A physician gathers medical information from a patient with the help of a local interpreter.

Cultural competence in healthcare refers to the ability for healthcare professionals to demonstrate cultural competence toward patients with diverse values, beliefs, and feelings. This process includes consideration of the individual social, cultural, and psychological needs of patients for effective cross-cultural communication with their health care providers. The goal of cultural competence in health care is to reduce health disparities and to provide optimal care to patients regardless of their race, gender, ethnic background, native languages spoken, and religious or cultural beliefs. Cultural competency training is important in health care fields where human interaction is common, including medicine, nursing, allied health, mental health, social work, pharmacy, oral health, and public health fields.

The term cultural competence was first used by Terry L. Cross and colleagues in 1989, but it was not until almost a decade later that health care professionals began to be formally educated and trained in cultural competence. In 2002, cultural competence in health care emerged as a field and has been increasingly embedded into medical education curricula and taught in health settings around the world since then.

== Definitions ==
Cultural competence is a practice of values and attitudes that aims to optimize the healthcare experience of patients with cross cultural backgrounds. Essential elements that enable organizations to become culturally competent include valuing diversity, having the capacity for cultural self-assessment, being conscious of the dynamics inherent when cultures interact, having institutionalized cultural knowledge, and having developed adaptations to service delivery reflecting an understanding of cultural diversity. By definition, diversity includes differences in race, ethnicity, age, gender, size, religion, sexual orientation, and physical and mental ability. Accordingly, organizations should include these considerations in all aspects of policy making, administration, practice, and service delivery.

Cultural competence involves more than having sensitivity or awareness of cultures. It necessitates an active process of learning and developing skills to engage effectively in cross-cultural situations and re-evaluating these skills over time. Cultural competence is often used interchangeably with the term cultural competency. Multicultural competency is a more encompassing term that includes the ability to function effectively in cross-cultural interactions with a wide range of different cultural groups. Acquiring cultural competence is a continuous process.

Other terms relating to cultural competence include cultural responsiveness, cultural humility, cultural intelligence, and cultural safety. Cultural responsiveness involves recognizing the unique cultural identity of each client and exploring the differences as well as being open to valuing clients’ knowledge and expertise. Cultural humility is the process by which providers participate in the process of self-reflection and self-critique devoted to being life-long learners or practitioners to further address power differences between professionals and clients and a commitment to respect the clients’ values. Cultural intelligence relies on cultural metacognition (knowledge of your own attitudes and values) and encompasses the ability to interact effectively with culturally different clients. Cultural safety relates to the assumptions of power held by health providers of particular groups of people that have been historically marginalized. Providers must recognize their own beliefs, attitudes, and culture to foster a safe, trusting, and respectful experience for their clients to encourage trust and empowerment.

=== Awareness ===
The awareness aspect of cultural competence relates to the consciousness of one's personal reactions to people who look or exhibit different practices from cultural norms. According to the American Sociological Association, culture itself is understood as the languages, customs, beliefs, rules, arts, knowledge, collective identities, and memories shared by members of a social group that form the foundations of motives or actions. In measuring cultural competence in health care, one must recognize their own implicit biases toward patients or employees. Lack of awareness causes cultural discrimination during patient care. An analysis by researchers at UC San Francisco, UC Berkeley, and Stanford University found that almost one in five patients with chronic conditions over the age of 54 reported feeling discrimination within health care in a national survey that took place between 2008 and 2014.

=== Attitude ===
Paul Pedersen, a pioneer in multicultural competence, theorized a framework of culturally competence practices that consisted of three factors: awareness, knowledge, and skills. The Diversity Training University International (DTUI) included an attitude component that is delineated from the other factors increasing the analysis of general biases and beliefs as a scheme in one's daily life. This differs from an exercise that forces students to examine their own values and beliefs of cultural differences.

=== Knowledge ===
The problem of cultural incompetency lies in the lack of familiarity of the cultural and social experiences of the patient. Social psychologist Patricia Devine and her colleges conducted research that found that low-scorers on a cultural familiarity test tended to exemplify more discriminatory actions or speech in cross-cultural interactions. When awareness, attitudes, and knowledge are given prominence in these encounters, ethnocentrism, racism, and inequitable relations are no longer present.

Knowledge of culture also includes awareness of the structural, social, and environmental barriers that give meaning to certain actions in patients' lives. In the Cross-cultural Counseling Inventory, practitioners are examined by their understanding of "the current socio-political system and its impact on the client". In 2017, there was an estimated 20.5 million Black, Hispanic, and Native Americans living below the poverty line. Without taking aspects like socioeconomic status, immigrant status, and environment into consideration, physicians often resort to stereotyping or biases in their behavior.

=== Skills ===
The skills aspect of cultural competence involves implementing the practices of cultural knowledge, sensitivity, and awareness into daily experiences with patients. One aspect of developing skills is learning respectful and effective communication strategies whether within an organization or between individuals. Learning communication practices includes examining communication through body language and other non-verbal cue as some gestures may have extreme variations and meanings from one culture to another. Developing skills is an active process that requires reexamining one's own internal belief system.

== Cultural competence in various settings ==
=== Healthcare system ===
A healthcare system, sometimes referred to as health system, is the organization of people, institutions, and resources that deliver healthcare services to meet the health needs of target populations. A culturally competent health system not only recognizes and accepts the importance of cultural diversity at every level but also assesses the cross-cultural relations, stays vigilant towards any changes and developments resulting from cultural diversity, broadens cultural knowledge, and adapts services to meet the needs that are culturally-unique.

As more and more immigrants are coming to America, healthcare professionals with good cultural competence can use the knowledge and sensitivity that they obtain in order to provide holistic care for clients from other countries, who speak foreign languages. The challenges for American healthcare systems to meet the health needs of the increasing number of diverse patients are becoming very obvious. The challenges include but are not limited to the following:

- Sociocultural barriers
- Poor cross-cultural communication
- Language barriers
- Attitudes toward healthcare
- Beliefs in diagnosis and treatment
- Lack of cultural competence in the design of the system

=== Leadership and workforce ===
In response to a rapid growth of the population of minority groups in the United States, healthcare organizations have responded by providing new services and undergoing health reforms in terms of diversity in leadership and workforce. Despite improvements and progress seen in some areas, minorities are still underrepresented within both healthcare leadership and workforce.

=== Clinical practice ===
To provide culturally sensitive patient-centered care, physicians should treat each patient as an individual, recognizing and respecting his or her beliefs, values and care seeking behaviors. However, many physicians lack the awareness of or training in cultural competence. With the constantly changing demographics, their patients are increasingly getting diverse as well. It is utterly important to educate physicians to be culturally competent so that they can effectively treat patients of different cultural and ethnic backgrounds.

Ignorance of these cultural differences could manifest in discomfort for the patient, subpar healthcare, incorrect diagnosis, and even racism, all which lower patients’ access to quality healthcare. Studies stress culturally sensitive training and education programs in healthcare settings that will impart to physicians how culture can affect healthcare treatment. Additionally, when interacting with patients of different cultures, specifically East Asian culture, it is important to “bridge the health care system with more traditional Eastern medical care… entail[ing] education for health professionals as part of a broader curriculum on providing culturally competent care.” Within western healthcare, there are also large amounts of inaccuracies and misperceptions of health risks for different minority groups, which could be addressed through further linguistically and culturally appropriate health education.

Implicit bias aimed towards certain races or ethnicities is frequent in the healthcare field, specifically in the United States, commonly with Black Americans, Hispanic Americans, and American Indians. Subconscious discrimination occurs regardless of the advancement of disease prevention in the United States, as shown by the significantly high mortality rates of the groups mentioned earlier in the paragraph. This discrimination is shaped by attitudes of healthcare professionals, who often differ in effort and type of treatment based on the race and physical appearance of a patient. Carrying over to the diagnosis and treatment of minority patients, the disparities in quality of healthcare increase the likelihood of developing diseases such as asthma, HIV/AIDs and other life-threatening diseases. For example, a study that focused on the treatment and diagnosis differences between black women and white women in regards to breast cancer indicated this discrimination against minorities and its effects. Furthermore, the study indicated that "white women are more likely to be diagnosed with breast cancer, [and] Black women are more likely to die from it."

The differences in responses from healthcare professionals to black patients versus white patients is drastic, indicated by subconscious negative perceptions of various races. In a study that evaluated physicians' immediate assumptions made about different races "two-thirds of the clinicians subconsciously formed a bias against Blacks (43% moderate to strong) and Latinos (51% moderate to strong)". Without intentionally concocting stereotypes about patients, these clinicians are indirectly negatively affecting the patients they mistreat. To remedy this, the study expresses support for clinicians to form a stronger connection with each patient and to focus on the patient at hand, rather than considering their race or background. This will help to prevent negative attitudes and tones when speaking with patients, creating a positive atmosphere that allows for equal environments and treatments for all patients, regardless of race or physical appearance.

These subconscious negative perceptions of different races could also potentially lead to mistrust of western healthcare by minority populations. Mistrust of the government or Western medicine is a big reason that many immigrant/minority populations do not seek out healthcare, leading them to believe that equitable, affordable, quality healthcare is not a resource that is available to them. A program called Minnesota Immunization Networking Initiative (MINI) was started “in 2006 to reduce vaccination barriers of underserved populations” like African-Americans, Hispanic-Americans, etc. MINI succeeded in increasing vaccination and trust within these communities. Their success came from engaging the community, establishing strong partnerships with service providers, and actively involving and communicating with community partners, and holding clinics in trusted community facilities. Other research studies have also recommended that providers build trust with clients by making efforts to establish relationships with patients and “keeping in mind unique cultural profiles."

In response to the increasingly diverse population, several states (WA, CA, CT, NJ, NM) have passed legislation requiring or strongly recommending cultural competency training for physicians. In 2005, New Jersey legislature enacted a law requiring all physicians to complete at least 6 hours of training in cultural competency as a condition for renewal of their New Jersey medical license, whether or not they actively practice in New Jersey. Physicians' responses to this CME requirement varied, both positively and negatively. But the overall feedback was positive towards the outcomes of participation in and satisfaction with the programs. The United States also passed federal legislation on Culturally and Linguistically Appropriate Standards (CLAS), which is legislation aimed at reducing healthcare inequities like those in refugee health in the United States through culturally competent care.

In order to provide culturally competent care for their diverse patients, physicians should at the first step understand that patients' cultures can influence profoundly how they define health and illness, how they seek health care, and what constitutes appropriate treatment. They should also realize that their clinical care process could also be influenced by their own personal and professional experiences as well as biomedical culture. Dr. Like pointed out in one of his articles that "in transforming systems, transcultural nurses, physicians, and other health care professionals need to remember that cultural humility and cultural competence must go hand in hand."

=== Community Health Clinics ===
Because of insurance, costs, and a variety of other reasons, the types of services needed to meet the needs of minority communities are not usually offered at private hospitals. Federally qualified health centers (FQHCs) are legally mandated to provide primary care for medically underserved communities, and thus are ideal settings to implement and provide culturally and linguistically inclusive services to immigrant communities.

Community Health Centers, at their most basic level, provide low to no cost primary medical care to low-income, minority, and underserved communities. They are usually located in underserved communities and neighborhoods, with the idea to increase access, reduce travel and wait times, and to combat gentrification. They were meant to be of the people, by the people.

In an Integrated Care Model that allows clients to get an all-in-one-experience, the CHC model was unique in that it offered a wide range of auxiliary services in addition to primary care, such as dental, behavioral, social services, etc. CHC's also “pride themselves equally on providing community-accountable and culturally competent care aimed at reducing health disparities associated with poverty, race, language, and culture”, as seen by their offered translation, interpretation, transportation, and social services. According to research, CHC's have successfully increased health service utilization in low-income areas, as well as lowered hospital admissions and readmissions (a positive metric) compared with other major providers of primary care in these areas.

=== Occupational Therapy ===
Occupational therapists are a member of healthcare among the allied health professions and can offer a unique contribution to the improvement of cultural competence. In healthcare, occupational therapists work with a variety of individuals across the lifespan with a variety of diagnosis or impairments in a client-centered approach to use meaningful activities or interventions to improve their quality of life and promote independence. Due to the client-centered approach, occupational therapists have the opportunity to develop trusting relationships with clients and use an individual's client factors related to beliefs and values while being culturally sensitive to their needs and desires for their own outcomes in treatment. Occupational therapists develop an individualized effective intervention plan based on understanding the client's values and beliefs of health and illness. The therapist-patient relationship is very important in occupational therapy to promote the client's engagement in purposeful activities and meaningful occupations from the client's cultural view. Therefore, learning about culture, applying cultural knowledge and reflecting on culture is crucial to reach the ultimate goals of the treatment plan successfully with equity and justice.

A useful resource that is available to assist with improving cultural competence is listed on the American Occupational Therapy Association (AOTA) website and provides more extensive definitions of various cultural terms and cultural competence toolkits which provide resources and information regarding specific groups of individuals that can be helpful in improving cultural competence in practice as an occupational therapist.

=== Research ===
Cultural competence in research is the ability of researchers and research staff to provide high quality research that takes into account the culture and diversity of a population when developing research ideas, design, and methodology. Cultural competence can be crucial for ensuring that the sampling is representative of the population and therefore application to a diverse number of people. It is important that a study's subject enrollment reflect as closely as possible the target population of those affected by the health problem being studied.

In 1994, the National Institutes of Health established policy (Public Law 103-43) for the inclusion of women, children, and members of minority groups and their subpopulations in biomedical and behavioral clinical studies. Overcoming challenges to cultural competence in research also means that institutional review board membership should include representatives of large communities and cultural groups as representatives.

=== Medical education ===
The critical importance of training medical students to be future culturally competent physicians has been recognized by accrediting bodies such as the Accreditation Council on Graduate Medical Education (ACGME) and the Liaison Committee on Medical Education (LCME) and other medical organizations such as American Medical Association (AMA) and the Institute of Medicine (IOM).

Culture is definitely beyond ethnicity and race. Healthcare professionals need to learn about the tolerance of other's beliefs. Professional care is about meeting patients' needs even if they do not align with the caretaker's personal beliefs. Discovering one's own beliefs and their origin (from upbringing or modeling of parents, for example) helps understand what is believed and moderates actions at times when others are cared for with different beliefs. As a result, it is essential for healthcare professionals to practice cultural competence and recognize the differences as well as cultural sensitivities to provide holistic care for the patients.

According to the LCME standard for cultural competence, "the faculty and students must demonstrate an understanding of the manner in which people of diverse culture and belief systems perceive health and illness and respond to various symptoms, diseases, and treatments." In response to the mandates, medical schools in the U.S. have incorporated teaching cultural competency in their curricula. A search on cultural competency in the curriculum of a medical school revealed that it was covered in 33 events in 13 courses in spring 2014. A similar search was performed on health disparities yielding 16 events in 10 courses covering the topic.

The cultural competence curriculum is intended to improve the interaction between patients and physicians and to assure that students will possess the knowledge, skills, and attitudes that enable them to provide high quality and culturally competent care to patients and their families as well as the general medical community.

A "visual intervention" was completed to educate healthcare professionals on the dangers of subconscious discrimination toward minority groups in order to lessen the common discrimination certain races or ethnicities face in a healthcare setting. This study allowed for physicians to focus more on the problems of their patients, and truly listening to their issues. By creating a supportive space that fosters a strong channel of communication, the study targeted the lack of connection between healthcare professionals and patients due to either language barriers or the patient's mistrust in the professional.

=== Patient education ===
Patient-Physician communication involves two sides. While physicians and other healthcare providers are being encouraged or required to be culturally competent in delivery of quality healthcare, it would be reasonable to encourage patients as well to be culturally sensitive and be aware that not all health care providers are equally competent in cultures. When it comes to illness, cultural beliefs and values affect greatly a patient's behavior in seeking healthcare. They should try their best to communicate their concerns relating to their beliefs, values and other cultural factors that might affect care and treatment to their physicians and other healthcare providers. If effective communication is unlikely achieved, then they should be provided with language assistance and interpretation services. Recognizing that patients receive the best care when they work in partnership with doctors, the General Medical Council issued guidance for patients "What to expect from your doctor: a guide for patients" in April 2013.

Health promotion advertising campaigns. Communication campaigns are attempts to inform or influence behaviors in large audiences to produce noncommercial benefits to individuals and society. Health communications designed for the general audience may not reach many due to cultural and language barriers. Cultural competence is analyzing, detecting and correcting these barriers. A one size fits all approach is not optimal for cultural competence. Instead, specific community organizations would know best about their own specific concerns. Care should be taken to not make the intended audience feel targeted. Public health advertising that features models who belong to their own group may cause a "Why us?" reaction. Public health advertising featuring minorities does not generate this backlash effect when the advertising appears in community-based publications mostly read by the featured group. Examples: In March 2022, Houston Health Department (HHD) announced minority-owned, Houston-based media and creative business firm 9thWonder Agency as its partner to help reduce vaccine hesitancy.

=== Nursing ===
The core functions of a nurse rely on conversation and communication, which is directly impacted by the ability to speak or understand the language and culture of the patient. However, there are limited interventions for nurses to effectively manage language discordance. One study aimed to understand the components of nursing that are impacted by language discordance and the interventions that have been successfully used to overcome these barriers. The authors analyzed 299 studies and 24 met the selection criteria. The selection criteria included whether the studies addressed the topic of language discordance and the languages the studies were published in. The studies were mainly qualitative and were not large, numerical experiments. The majority, 20 out of 24, of the studies only focused on using interpreter services, whether they are professional or ad-hoc. While the risks of ad-hoc interpreters are clearly posed in the studies, the nurses regularly resort to ad-hoc interpreters when professional interpreters are not available. The authors recommend that each health care service plan and implement processes and systems to give nurses the tools, training, or resources they need to effectively carry out their job, specifically when communicating with patients who do not speak the same first language as them. Nevertheless, this study provides another angle to support the argument that interpreters and resources to mitigate the risks of language barriers are urgent for not just the diverse patient, but also for the clinicians who want to provide the best possible care.

== Challenges to cultural competence ==
=== Language barriers ===
Linguistic competence involves communicating effectively with diverse populations, including individuals with limited English proficiency (LEP), low literacy skills or are not literate, disabilities, and individuals with any degree of hearing loss. According to the U.S. Census in 2011, 25.3 million people are considered limited English proficient, accounting for 9% of the U.S. population. Hospitals frequently admit LEP patients for treatment. With cultural and linguistic barriers, it is not surprising that it is hard to achieve effective communication between the health care providers and the LEP patients. Results from a 2019 systematic review of the literature found that overcoming the English-language barrier for LEP patients is a factor connected with improving patient health outcomes. Even so, in 2021, 25 million people who spoke Spanish received a third less health care than those that spoke English or other Americans.

The National Culturally and Linguistically Appropriate Services (CLAS) Standards in Health and Health Care developed by the Office of Minority Health (OMH) are intended to advance health equity, improve quality and help eliminate health care disparities. The three themes of the fifteen CLAS standards areGovernance, Leadership, and workforce; Communication and Language Assistance; and Engagement, Continuous Improvement, and Accountability. The standards clearly emphasized that the top levels of an organizational leadership hold the responsibility for CLAS implementation, and that language assistance should be provided when needed, and quality improvement, community engagement, and evaluation are importance.

Research emphasizes the need for culturally and linguistically sensitive services in providing healthcare to immigrant/minority populations, and studies show that interpreters and translation services could decrease linguistic barriers for minorities in clinical health settings. Communities who don't speak the dominant language would have a hard time accessing and understanding healthcare, especially when it comes to insurance. Immigrant communities might face even higher barriers to access because of cultural differences and not knowing how things work. In these cases, interpreters and language services are especially important.

==== Variability in interpreter use ====
Though the standard of interpreter use in medical discourses has been perceived to be the solution for cross-linguistic encounters within the hospital flow, a close analysis of the social role of the translator uncovers varying effects on the quality of care and accuracy of medical advice. A previous study of 83 U.S. public and private hospitals reported an average of 11 percent of the patient population requiring interpreter services. At one particular hospital, only seven full-time Spanish-English interpreters were hired to attend to the linguistic needs of 33,000 patients in need of Spanish interpretation. The high demand but low value for this position generates interpreters who may be ill-fit for the responsibility, consistently running late and not having the adequate training to perfectly translate the patient's needs or the doctors orders. Ad hoc translators were found to display a higher level of error frequency in their patient interactions with 77% of the translations being found to some level of inaccuracy. This is relatively higher compared to professional medical translators. Ad hoc translators are nurses, family members, or other available bilingual staff that are utilized on the spot for translation purposes. However, in the same study, professional translators were still found to exhibit error in 53% in their evaluated interactions. In a review of 28 in-site research studies conducted, use of professional interpreters was associated with overall improved clinical care in four categories: communication, utilization, clinical outcomes, and satisfaction. Of the twenty-eight, only six were found to have an overall patient rating of "satisfactory" or higher in the context of their clinic care with the use of a professional translator.

One of the big problems with language services is that it is maintained by the hospitals and clinics, and is the first to be cut in financial strain. Health insurance also does not reimburse the use of interpreters. It is shown from these studies that professional translation and interpreter services, coupled with language education, are not enough to overcome these cultural and linguistic hurdles. Clough et al. suggests that “culturally competent guidance provided by navigators from a patient's own ethnic community [patient navigators] might play a major role in overcoming barriers to healthcare.”

Community Navigators (also known as community health workers, patient navigators, health advocates, and a variety of other names) are healthcare workers who are trained to provide culturally appropriate support to populations with historically limited access to healthcare. Community Navigators work as the bridge between patients and providers, and help patients overcome language barriers, financial barriers, unfamiliarity with the healthcare system, cultural and religious differences, and more. In studies, Community Navigators have been found to improve primary outcomes relating to chronic disease management. For example, in studies, Community Navigators at Federally Qualified Health Clinics helped improve the cancer diagnosis and screening process and timeline among underserved, vulnerable populations. Many clinical practices, especially Federally Qualified Health Clinics, employ Community Navigators.

=== Cultural barriers ===
==== Diversity ====
One factor that impinges on delivery culturally competent care is the degree in which the leadership and workforce of the physician population reflect the rates of minority groups in the United States. Research has shown that for minority patients, racial similarity between patient and physician correlates with a greater sense of patient satisfaction. On a study conducted on a cohort of 147,815 primary care physicians, the Black, Hispanic, and Native American groups together constituted 13.4 percent of the population as compared. However, since 2018, these groups comprised a total of 33 percent of the population of the United States. Despite the small pool of Black and Hispanic physicians, studies show that 25 percent of Black patients participating in a study and 23 percent of the Hispanic patients had primary care physicians that coincided with their racial identity. Given their connections and experiences, minority health professionals are more likely to develop care models that more effectively meet the needs of the communities they serve. The lack of diversity and sociocultural awareness risks the chance of stereotyping patients or having lack of attentiveness to the individual needs of their patients.

A study of Asian American children showed that ethnic match between mental health provider and client increased the likelihood that the client would utilize the services, the number of sessions attended, and the functioning score at discharge, as well as decreased the likelihood the client would drop out of treatment. According to studies, a diverse and socially inclusive workforce is incredibly important. Thomson writes that direct provider-patient communication increases the chances of the patient's customs and beliefs being understood and taken into account during treatment, leading to better care.

===== Europe =====
International migration is a global and complex phenomenon. Many European countries, including Belgium, are experiencing increasing population diversity arising from international immigration. Labor migrants, past colonial links, and, for some countries, their strategic position in the European Union are factors contributing to this diversity. Leadership and Cultural Competence of Healthcare Professionals 2015

Routine medical care in Germany, Austria, and Switzerland is being increasingly impacted by the cultural and linguistic diversity of an ever more complex world. Both at home and as part of international student exchanges, medical students are confronted with different ways of thinking and acting in relation to health and disease. Despite an increasing number of courses on cultural competence and global health at German-speaking medical schools, systematic approaches are lacking on how to integrate this topic into medical curricula. Cultural Competence and Global Health: Perspectives for Medical Education – Position paper of the GMA Committee on Cultural Competence and Global Health 2018

== See also ==
- Community-based participatory research
- Culturally relevant teaching
- Ethnocentrism
- Global health
- Health status of Asian Americans
- Health system
- Intercultural competence
- Medical ethics
- Purnell Model for Cultural Competence
