= Intercultural Universities in Mexico =

Intercultural Universities in Mexico are higher education institutions which were established in 2004 in response to the lack of enrollment of the indigenous population in Mexico. While an estimated 10% of the population of Mexico is indigenous, it is the least represented in higher education. According to estimates, only between 1% and 3% of higher education enrollment in Mexico is indigenous. In response to this inequality, the General Coordination for Intercultural and Bilingual Education at the Ministry of Education established Intercultural Universities with the active participation of indigenous organizations and academic institutions in each region. These institutions are located in densely indigenous areas and, though they allow for diversity in enrollment, they are especially intended for the indigenous population. Founded on the principle of intercultural education, they aim to foster dialogue between different cultures and represent a way of responding to both the historical and more recent demands of indigenous peoples.

In congruence with the recognition of diversity, Intercultural Universities do not propose a fixed approach to their educational activities. While assuring the respect of some basic principles, each university defines its curriculum according to the needs and potentials of the region in which it is located. Students are engaged in activities that relate them to the surrounding communities through research and development projects, with the aim of working and contributing to the development of their territory, their people and their culture. Twelve Intercultural Universities are currently operating with a total enrollment of approximately 7,000 students and a high proportion of female students. Despite the challenges of financing, of students' living conditions and of political vulnerability that these universities face, they represent an important contribution to the achievement of educational equity.

== List of intercultural universities ==
- Universidad Autónoma Intercultural de Sinaloa
- Universidad Intercultural de Chiapas
- Universidad Intercultural del Estado de Guerrero
- Universidad Intercultural del Estado de México
- Universidad Intercultural del Estado de Puebla
- Universidad Intercultural del Estado de Tabasco
- Universidad Intercultural Indígena de Michoacán
- Universidad Intercultural Maya de Quintana Roo
- Universidad Veracruzana Intercultural
- Universidad Intercultural de San Luis Potosí
- Universidad Intercultural de Hidalgo
- Universidad Intercultural de Nayarit

== See also ==
- Education in Mexico
- Intercultural competence
- Intercultural relations
- Interculturalism

== Sources ==
This article incorporates text from a free content work. Licensed under CC-BY-SA IGO 3.0 (license statement/permission). Text taken from Rethinking Education: Towards a global common good?, 47, UNESCO, UNESCO. UNESCO.
