= Business Model of Intercultural Analysis =

The Business Model of Intercultural Analysis (BMIA) is a tool developed to address cross-cultural problems. The BMIA framework uses six comprehension lenses to analyze cross-cultural interaction in the business environment. The six comprehension lenses to examine enterprise-wide cross cultural challenges are cultural themes, communication, group dynamics, ‘glocalization,’ process engineering, and time orientation.
