= Local citizenship =

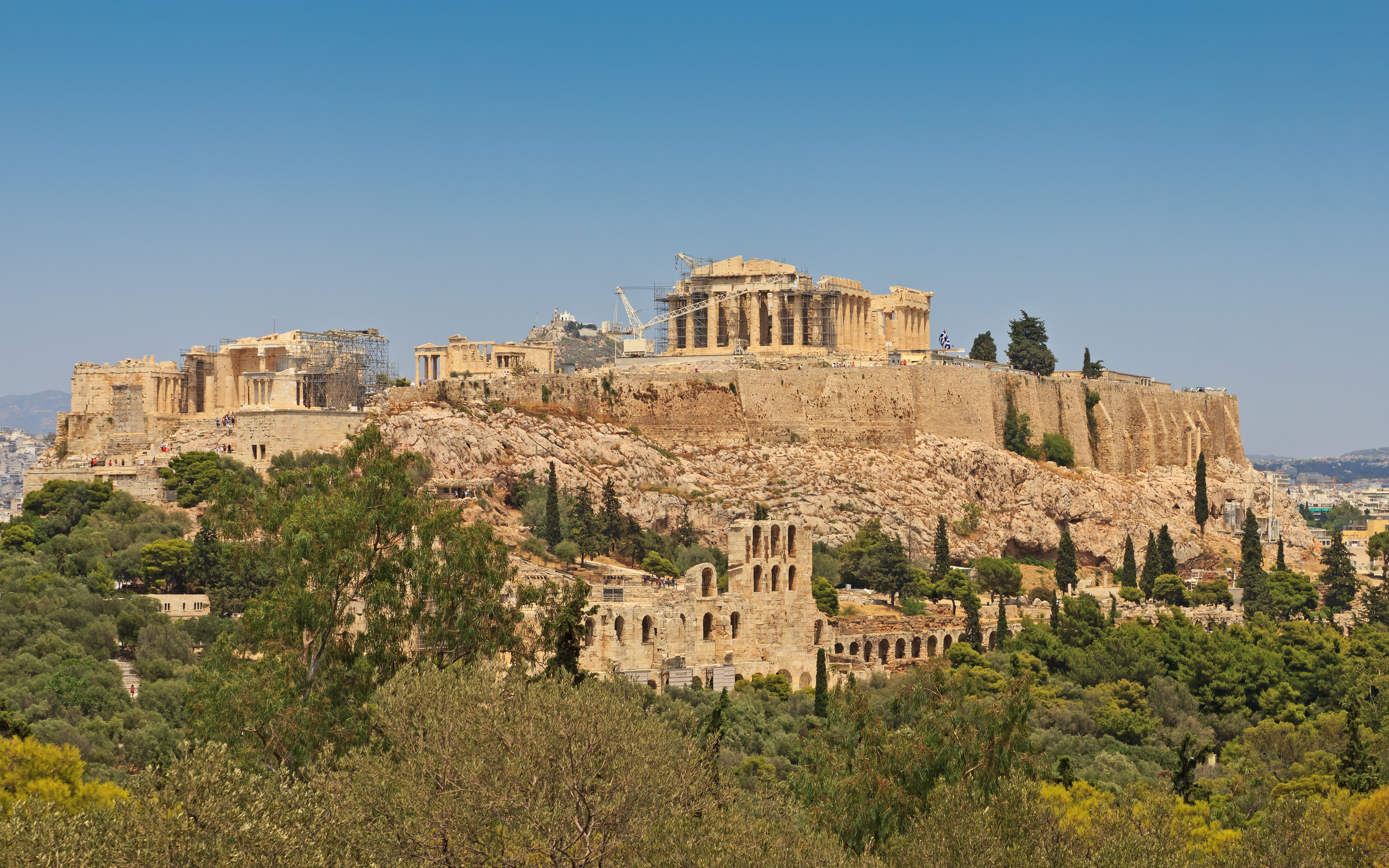
The Acropolis hill in Athens symbolizes the emergence of democracy and one of the first political communities formed by free individuals. The concept of local citizenship takes up some aspects of this original political community, especially its territorial scope at a city level, although it is characterized by much higher standards of inclusion than Athenian democracy.

Local citizenship (also known as "Urban Citizenship") is an emerging political approach to citizenship. Developed in particular by local civil society, human rights defenders and local governments, the main aim of this concept is to provide a framework to guarantee universal, non-discriminatory access to public services and full political and recognition of all inhabitants of a given urban territory, regardless of their administrative status.

The concept has been used in particular to address difficulties in access to public services by people in an irregular administrative situation, migrants and other marginalized groups. In this sense, local citizenship aims at tackling exclusion patterns caused by the possession (or lack) of formal national citizenship status. Proponents of local citizenship attribute to the concept a strong potential for renewing social inclusion policies and political participation at the city level. More broadly, it also represents an innovation for human rights practice. There are good examples of political development of this concept through public policies and new legislation, especially among local governments.

== Local citizenship background: Challenges linked with national citizenship ==
Citizenship today is a vehicle to access public services and rights provided by public administrations. It is also a form of political recognition as member of the community to which one belongs. This duality has characterized the concept of citizenship since its very origin, both in the Greek Polis (where the political community formed by free individuals and the democratic form of government emerged) as well as in the Roman world (where citizenship played a central role as a guarantee of both political and social rights).

Since the 19th century, the development of nation states has conditioned the emergence of a new concept of citizenship. This concept increasingly became associated with the formal recognition of belonging to a national state. This inclusion pattern led over time to situations of inequality and exclusion with those people and communities that remained on the margins of recognition (in spite of being part of the community). This exclusion pattern did not only affect migrants, but also ethnic communities and marginalized groups. At the same time, an intertwining occurred between state and the guarantee of social and economic rights through the provision of public services. Citizenship also guaranteed the political right to participate in public affairs in the context of democratic countries.

The formation of the contemporary human rights framework confirms the tendency for states to be responsible for the protection and respect of human rights, supposedly inspired by principles of universality and non-discrimination. However, authors such as Hannah Arendt warn of the risks associated with this trend, given that it generates potential challenges to the inclusion of groups on the margins of the state.

Currently, the global increase in migratory flows has brought to light several problems associated with this model. Despite the fundamental contribution of migrants, their lack of national citizenship often limits their right to political participation. In other cases, this anomaly is expressed in the difficulty of accessing public services or even the risk of deportation. This is another perspective of migration, not so much associated with the transit from one place to another, but with the process of inclusion in the host society in the long term and how the relationship between public administration and migrant resident is defined during the time that the potential administrative regularization process lasts.

== Theoretical approach to local citizenship ==
The notion of local citizenship is based on guaranteeing the human rights of all people living in a given territory. Accordingly, it structures public service delivery around residence alone as single condition for eligibility, as well as recognition and belonging in a given community. It call for an affirmative public action model, where different spheres of government give a political development to international human rights law in people's daily lives through proactive policymaking. It proposes an alternative model to the inclusion of migrants and other marginalized groups in increasingly heterogeneous societies, linked to concepts such as interculturality or intersectionality. Strong attention is also given to issues of local identity and social participation.

== Policy development of local citizenship ==
Local governments have been at the forefront of policy innovations in favor of local citizenship. Some examples are:

- Local residence cards and other institutional innovations that normalize access to public services for people in an irregular administrative situation.
- Support for the naturalization of migrants and prevention of deportations.
- Promotion of participatory budgets and councils for participation in local public affairs focused on the migrant community.
- Interventions in the public realm and built environment and awareness-raising campaigns that seek to favor the symbolic recognition of migrants in host societies.
- Training programs for migrants that favor their inclusion in the host society through language learning or the formation of a network of contacts.
- Creation of local mechanisms for the protection and promotion of human rights, such as local ombudsmen or offices for non-discrimination.

== See also ==
- Regionalism (politics)
