= Launch Complex 1 =

Launch Complex 1 may refer to:

- Baikonur Cosmodrome Site 1, an inactive R-7 (Soyuz) launch pad at the Baikonur Cosmorome
- Cape Canaveral Air Force Station Launch Complex 1, a deactivated US Air Force launch site
- Kourou ELA-1, a former Ariane launch complex now used by Vega rockets
- Point Arguello Launch Complex 1, now part of Vandenberg AFB Space Launch Complex 3
- Rocket Lab Launch Complex 1, Mahia Spaceport, Ahuriri Point, Mahia Peninsula, North Island, New Zealand
- Satish Dhawan Space Centre First Launch Pad
- Taiyuan Launch Complex 1, a Long March launch complex at the Taiyuan Satellite Launch Centre
- Vandenberg Space Launch Complex 1, a former Thor launch complex at Vandenberg AFB
- Blue Origin Launch Site One, Corn Ranch, Van Horn, Texas, USA

== See also ==
- SpaceX Landing Complex 1, Space Coast, Florida, USA
- Launch Complex (disambiguation)
- LC1 (disambiguation)
