= Cultural conflict =

Clash of beliefs or values

Cultural conflict is a type of conflict that occurs when different cultural values and beliefs clash. Broad and narrow definitions exist for the concept, both of which have been used to explain violence (including war) and crime, on either a micro or macro scale.

== Conflicting values ==
Jonathan H. Turner defines cultural conflict as a conflict caused by "differences in cultural values and beliefs that place people at odds with one another." On a micro level, Alexander Grewe discusses cultural conflict between hotel-guests of different culture and nationality as seen in the British 1970s sitcom Fawlty Towers. He defines this conflict as one that occurs when people's expectations of a certain behavior coming from their cultural backgrounds are not met, as others have different cultural backgrounds and different expectations.

Cultural conflicts are difficult to resolve as parties to the conflict have different beliefs. Cultural conflicts intensify when those differences become reflected in politics, particularly on a macro level. An example of cultural conflict is the debate over abortion. Ethnic cleansing is another extreme example of cultural conflict. Wars can also be a result of a cultural conflict; for example, differing views on slavery were one of the causes of the American Civil War.

== Crime and deviance ==
A more narrow definition of a cultural conflict dates to Daniel Bell's 1962 essay, "Crime as an American Way of Life", and focuses on criminal-enabling consequences of a clash in cultural values.

William Kornblum defines it as a conflict that occurs when conflicting norms create "opportunities for deviance and criminal gain in deviant subcultures." Kornblum notes that, whenever laws impose cultural values on a group that does not share those views (often, this is the case of the majority imposing their laws on a minority), illegal markets supplied by criminals are created to circumvent those laws. He discusses the example of prohibition in the interbellum United States, and notes how the cultural conflict between pro- and anti-alcohol groups created opportunities for illegal activity; another similar example he lists is that of the war on drugs.

Kornblum also classifies the cultural conflict as one of the major types of conflict theory. In The Clash of Civilizations Samuel P. Huntington proposes that people's cultural and religious identities will be the primary source of conflict in the post-Cold War world.

== Influence and understanding ==
Michelle LeBaron describes different cultures as "underground rivers that run through our lives and relationships, giving us messages that shape our perceptions, attributions, judgments, and ideas of self and other." She states that cultural messages "shape our understandings" when two or more people are present in regards to relationships, conflict, and peace. LeBaron discusses the influence of culture as being powerful and "unconscious, influencing conflict and attempts to resolve conflict in imperceptible ways." She states that the impact of culture is huge, affecting "name, frame, blame, and attempt to tame conflicts." Due to the huge impact that culture has on us, LeBaron finds it important to explain the "complications of conflict:"

- First, "culture is multi-layered," meaning that "what you see on the surface may mask differences below the surface."
- Second, "culture is constantly in flux," meaning that "cultural groups adapt in dynamic and sometimes unpredictable ways."
- Third, "culture is elastic," meaning that one member of a cultural group may not participate in the norms of the culture.
- Lastly, "culture is largely below the surface," meaning that it isn't easy to reach the deeper levels of culture and its meanings.

== See also ==
- Chronemics – Study of the role of time in communication
- Cultural diversity – Quality of diverse or different cultures
- Cultural divide – Boundary among people of different cultures
- Cultural genocide – Genocide involving destruction of culture
- Cultural hegemony – Marxist theory of cultural dominance
- Cultural imperialism – Cultural aspects of imperialism
- Cultural tourism – Geographical tourism around a country or a region
- Culture shock – Experience of a person moving to a different cultural environment
- Culture war – Conflict between cultural values
- Ethnic conflict – Conflict between ethnic groups
- Identity politics – Politics based on one's identity
- Language policy – Body of practices intended to cause a desired change in language
- Linguistic imperialism – Transfer of a dominant language to other people as a demonstration of power
- Linguistic rights – Right to choose one's own language
- Multiculturalism – Existence of multiple, distinct cultures within a single country
- Opposition to immigration § Import of culture
- Regionalism (politics) – Ideology that seeks to promote subnational administrative division interests
- Religious war – War primarily over religious differences
- Social cohesion – Bonding between members of a group
- War on Islam controversy – Belief in effort to destroy Islam
- Kulturkampf – Prussian church-state conflict (1872–1878)
