= Bromley Originate Change =

- Type: Public company
- Industry: Advertising
- Founded: 1981
- Founder: Lionel Sosa
- Headquarters: 401 E. Houston St. San Antonio, TX, United States
- Area served: Worldwide
- Key people: Ernest Bromley (Chairman and CEO)

Bromley is a full-service Hispanic and Transcultural Advertising Agency that was founded in 1981. It is majority owned by Ernest Bromley, Chairman/CEO, and Publicis Groupe S.A. has a minority stake in it. Bromley is based in Downtown San Antonio in the U.S. state of Texas.

== Index ==
In 1981 they opened their doors under the name of Sosa & Associates under the leadership of Lionel Sosa.

In 1985 Sosa & Associates named Ernest Bromley as the Chief Operating Officer (COO) after successfully leading the company's Research/Account Planning department.

By 1989, DMB&B, Inc., NY partnered with Sosa & Associates. Shortly after the partnership, Lionel Sosa was named Chairman of DMB&B/Americas.

By 1990, Ernest Bromley became a partner and Sosa & Associates became Sosa, Bromley, Aguilar & Associates. In 1993, Ernest Bromley was named Chief Executive Officer of Sosa, Bromley, Aguilar & Associates.

Only a year into his position as CEO, Ernest Bromley led the merger with Noble & Associates, Irvine California and the agency became Sosa, Bromley, Aguilar, Noble & Associates under the MacManus Group holding company.

In 1997, after the retirement of Lionel Sosa the agency formerly known as Sosa, Bromley, Aguilar, Noble & Associates became Bromley Aguilar & Associates.

Looking to further expand its resources, in 1999 the agency established Bromley/MS&L, a full-service PR division, through a partnership with Manning Selvage & Lee, one of the world's top ten PR firms.

By 2000, after several mergers and partners, Bromley Aguilar & Associates became Bromley Communications under B|Com3 holding company.

In 2002, B|Com3 holding company was purchased by Publicis Groupe, S.A., holding company and Bromley Communications joined the 4th largest conglomerate in the world.

In 2004, Bromley Communications and Publicis Sanchez & Levitan merged under the Bromley Communications name to become the largest Hispanic Advertising agency in the nation in terms of size and billings.

== Key Campaigns and Clients ==
Below is a glimpse at some of Bromley's key partnerships through the years. As pioneers of Hispanic Advertising, Bromley has had many firsts in the industry.

In 1983, Sosa & Associates was named Kroger Grocery's first ever Hispanic Agency of Record (AOR).

In 1987, Sosa & Associates was named Domino's Pizza’s first ever Hispanic Agency of Record (AOR).

By 1988, Sosa & Associates became the first Hispanic agency to win a Clio for their work on “Hispanics get AIDS” in U.S. Television/Cinema category.

In 1989, Sosa & Associates solidified its space in the consumer-marketing arena by being named Burger King’s Hispanic Agency of Record (AOR).

In 1991, Sosa, Bromley, Aguilar & Associates was named NCNB’s first ever Hispanic Agency of Record (AOR).

In 2000, Bromley won the San Antonio Convention and Visitors Bureau account, becoming the first Hispanic agency to be named General Market Agency of Record for the city of San Antonio. This relationship lasted for 12 years and helped position San Antonio as a top vacation destination.

In 2001, Bromley was named Payless ShoeSource's Hispanic Agency of Record (AOR). Over 10 years, Bromley helped launch Payless in 10 countries in Latin America and the Caribbean (Colombia, Costa Rica, Dominican Republic, Ecuador, El Salvador, Honduras, Jamaica, Puerto Rico).

In 2002, Bromley was named the Coors Brewing Company’s Hispanic Agency of Record (AOR). With almost 10 years of being partners, Bromley has expanded its services to the MillerCoors portfolio of brands.

In 2006, General Mills hired Bromley to help them reach different Hispanic consumer segments with three brands. Today, Bromley works with 13 brands targeting both the Hispanic consumer as well as the general market consumer through brands like Totino’s.

Recently Bromley has helped create new brands within existing marquee brands that will speak directly to Hispanic consumers.

In 2009, the National Basketball Association partnered with Bromley to develop a specific brand for its bicultural/bilingual consumer segment by creating a brand that spoke directly to them. This allowed Hispanics to bring to the game of basketball what was theirs • Pride • Passion • Voice. Thus creating a unique brand for Hispanics - éne•bé•a.

In 2008 Ernest Bromley was named the Godfather of Hispanic Advertising by the American Marketing Association’s (AMA). Soon after, in 2010, Jessica Pantanini, Bromley Chief Operating Officer and former Media Director, was named the Godmother of Hispanic Marketing by the American Marketing Association (AMA).

== Innovations ==
In 1981, Mr. Bromley developed for Sosa & Associates, the Acculturation Influence Groups (AIG), a proprietary approach that grouped Hispanics consumers by acculturation lifestyles rather than by country of origin.

In 2004 Bromley launched “Latino ViBE: A Portrait of Ethnic Self-Identification among U.S. Hispanics”, a study that focused on acculturation, assimilation and the impact of ethnic identity on today's Hispanic market.

== Awards ==
=== 2011 Awards ===
- ARF David Ogilvy Awards

GOLD
Category: Total Shopper Market Category
Advertiser: Progresso
“Tasting is Believing”

- ADDY Awards – San Antonio Ad Fed

Best of Show
Category: TV
Advertiser: NBA
“Kiss”

Judges Award
Best Print Campaign – OOH
Advertiser: Totino’s
“Kid’s Favorite”

Gold
Category: Print
Advertiser: Progresso
“Esta Si Es Sopa”

Gold
Category: TV Campaign
Advertiser: NBA
“Save Your Passion”

Gold
Category: Cinema
Advertiser: NBA
“Kiss”

Gold
Category: Internet
Advertiser: NBA
“Tow Truck”

Silver
Category: Special FX
Advertiser: Yoplait
“Slice”

Silver
Category: Radio
Advertiser: NBA
“Automated System”

Silver
Category: TV Campaign
Advertiser: NBA

- ADDY Awards – District 10 Regional Ad Fed

Gold
Category: TV Campaign
Advertiser: NBA
“Pobre Garganta”

Gold
Category: Special FX
Advertiser: Yoplait
“Slice”

Silver
Category: Cinema
Advertiser: NBA
“Kiss”

Silver
Category: TV Campaign
Advertiser: NBA
“Save Your Passion”

- HSMAI Adrian Award

Bronze
Category: PR Campaign
Advertiser: San Antonio Convention & Visitors Bureau
“GMA Pride, Passion and Piñatas”

Silver
Category: PR Campaign
Advertiser: San Antonio Convention & Visitors Bureau
“Deep. In the Heart.”

Gold
Category: Email Series
Advertiser: San Antonio Convention & Visitors Bureau

=== 2010 Awards ===
- ARF David Ogilvy Awards

Silver
Category: Multicultural
Advertiser: Progresso
Media: Bromley
Research: MOLA; Market Tools, Inc.
“Tasting is Believing”

Silver
Category: Household Products (Total Market)
Advertiser: Reynolds Wrap
Media: Bromley
Research: Encuesta
“Piénsalo Bien”

- ADDY Awards – San Antonio Ad Fed

Gold
Category: Print
Advertiser: Honey Nut Cheerios
“Abrazo” Campaign

Gold
Category: TV
Advertiser: Yoplait
“Peel”

Gold
Category: TV
Advertiser: Yoplait Delights
“Out”

Gold
Category: Print
Advertiser: San Antonio Convention & Visitors Bureau
“History Wall”

Silver
Category: TV
Advertiser: Honey Nut Cheerios
“Son”

Silver ADDY Award
Category: TV
Advertiser: La Lechera
“Contagia”

- Circulo Creativo – Young Creatives

Winner
Category: TV

- Cannes Young Lion

Silver
Category: Film

- FIAP – Festival IberoAmericano de Publicidad

Finalist
Category: Production Techniques
Advertiser: Yoplait
“Peel”

- Bronze Quill Award (IABC)

Award of Excellence
Category: Multicultural – Communication
Advertiser: Western Union
“¡Sí! Western Union Helps Make Dreams Come True”

Award of Excellence
Category: Brand Communication
Advertiser: Western Union
“¡Sí! Western Union Helps Make Dreams Come True”

- PR News Platinum Awards

Honorable Mention
Category: Multicultural Marketing
Advertiser: Western Union
“¡Sí! Western Union Helps Make Dreams Come True”

- SABRE Award

Silver Finalist
Advertiser: Western Union
“¡Sí! Western Union Helps Make Dreams Come True”

- PRSA Del Oro Awards

Best of Show
Category: Marketing
Advertiser: Western Union
“¡Sí! Western Union Helps Make Dreams Come True”

Category: Multicultural
Advertiser: Western Union
“¡Sí! Western Union Helps Make Dreams Come True”

Category: Special Events
Advertiser: Coors Light
“Cold-Activated Can Launch”

Award of Merit
Category: Multicultural
Advertiser: Coors Light
“Cold-Activated Can Launch”

- Hispanic PR Association

Campaign of the Year
Category: Integrated Marketing Communications
Advertiser: Western Union
“¡Sí! Western Union Helps Make Dreams Come True”

- Texas PR Association

Silver Spur
Category: Multicultural
Advertiser: Western Union
“¡Sí! Western Union Helps Make Dreams Come True”

=== 2009 Awards ===
- ADDY Awards – San Antonio Ad Fed

Gold
Category: Music Score
Advertiser: San Antonio Convention & Visitors Bureau
“Deep. In the Heart”

Gold
Category: Poster
Advertiser: San Antonio Convention & Visitors Bureau
“Deep. In the Heart”

Silver
Category: Brochure
Advertiser: San Antonio Convention & Visitors Bureau
“Deep. In the Heart” Lure Brochure en Español”

Silver
Category: Full Page Consumer Magazine
Advertiser: Reynolds Wrap
“Stencil”

- ARF David Ogilvy Awards

Gold
Category: Multicultural – Consumer & Health
Advertiser: Ovations/Evercare
Media: Bromley
Research: Bromley/Culturati Research
“¿Cómo Estás?”

Gold
Category: Total Market – Health Care
Advertiser: Honey Nut Cheerios
Media: Bromley
Research: IFC Research LTD.
“Best of Both Worlds”

=== 2008 Awards ===
- ADDY Awards – San Antonio Ad Fed

Silver
Category: Consumer or Trade Pub
Advertiser: San Antonio Convention & Visitors Bureau
“Find Yourself – Noble Elders”

Gold
Category: Online Campaign
Advertiser: Always
“Solo de Chikas”

Gold
Category: TV – Consumer Products
Advertiser: Honey Nut Cheerios
“Phone”

Gold
Category: TV – Consumer Products
Advertiser: Yoplait
“I Am”

Gold
Category: TV – Consumer Products
Advertiser: Juicy Juice
“Full Circle”

Silver
Category: TV – Consumer Products
Advertiser: Reynolds Wrap
“Piénsalo Bien”
