= Cultural divide =

Boundary among people of different cultures

A cultural divide is "a boundary in society that separates communities whose social economic structures, opportunities for success, conventions, styles, are so different that they have substantially different psychologies". A cultural divide is the virtual barrier caused by cultural differences, that hinder interactions, and harmonious exchange between people of different cultures. For example, avoiding eye contact with a superior shows deference and respect in East Asian cultures, but can be interpreted as suspicious behavior in Western cultures. Studies on cultural divide usually focus on identifying and bridging the cultural divide at different levels of society.

== Significance ==
A cultural divide can have significant impact on international operations on global organizations that require communication between people from different cultures. Commonly, ignorance of the cultural differences such as social norms and taboos may lead to communication failure within the organization.

Sufficiently large cultural divides may also discourage groups from seeking to understand the other party's point of view, as differences between the groups are seen as immutable. Such gaps may in turn inhibit efforts made to reach a consensus between these groups.

== Factors and causes ==
=== Internal ===
Internal causes of Cultural Divide refer to causes based on innate or personal characteristics of an individual, such as a personal way of thinking, an internal mental structure or habit that influences how a person acts.

==== Ideological differences ====
Rules, norms and way of thinking are often inculcated from a young age and these help to shape a person's mindset and their thinking style, which will explain how two different cultural groups can view the same thing very differently. For example, Western cultures with their history of Judeo-Christian belief in the individual soul and focus on the pursuit of individual rights tend to adopt an individualistic mindset whereas East Asian cultures with a history of teachings based on Confucianism tend to view the individual as a relation to the larger community and hence develop a more collectivist mindset. Hence, it is more common for people in collectivist cultures to make an external attribution while people in individualistic cultures making an internal attribution. Thus, these differences can cause how people, situations or objects are perceived differently.

==== Stereotypes ====
Perceptions about an out-group or of a different culture may tend to be perpetuated and reinforced by the media or long-standing notions of stereotypes. As a result of using schemas to simplify the world as we look at it, we rely on a set of well-established stereotypes available in our own culture to define and view the out-group. As such, the risk of stereotypes is if it is inaccurate and blinds us to certain key understanding of a certain class of people, and as stereotypes tend to persist even with new information, the problem of cultural divide can be perpetuated.

==== Social identity theory ====
The social identity theory implies an inherent and inclined favoritism towards people of the same social group as you or people who share similar characteristics, also known as the in-group favoritism. This desire to achieve and maintain a positive self-image motivates people to place their own group in a superior position as compared to the out-group.

=== External ===
Cultural divide can also be caused by external influences that shape the way an individual thinks about people from other cultures. For example, the cultural disconnect and misunderstandings between USA and the Arab countries has been attributed to the spread of superficial information that "serve to promote self-interests and perpetuate reckless acts of individuals, misguided official policies and irresponsible public narratives, all colored by self-righteousness and hypocrisy". An individual's experience of foreign cultures can be largely shaped by the information available to the individual and the cultural divide arises due to the difference between a culture and how it is perceived by people foreign to the culture.

Some examples of external sources that influence views on other cultures include:

==== Official government policies ====
This also includes any official source of information by the government such as speeches by government officials. Government attitudes to foreign governments often lead to information released to citizens that influence the way they think about foreign governments and foreign peoples. One extreme example of this propaganda.

==== News and media reports ====
Media bias can cause misunderstandings and cultural divide by controlling the information and perceptions of other cultures. For example, media bias in the United States can exacerbate the political divide between the liberals and the conservatives.

==== Social pressure ====
Due to a fundamental need for social companionship and a desire to be accepted and liked by others, people often conform to social norms and adopt the group's beliefs and values. Hence, groups that are already culturally divided will tend to remain that way as the effect of normative social influence is self-perpetuating.

== Bridging the cultural divide ==
When a cultural divide can be bridged, it can be beneficial for all parties. However, when cultures are vastly different, or if people are opposed to such exchange, the cultural divide may prove difficult to cross.

=== Understanding cultural boundaries ===
Being aware of cultural boundaries when dealing with others is important to avoid accidentally offending the other party and turning the difference into a divide. Educating both parties in the reasons behind these boundaries would also help foster trust and cooperation between them. This also has a side effect of creating a virtuous cycle, where the improved understanding between both parties grants them an advantage when dealing with members of the opposite culture, encouraging future communication and reducing the impact of a cultural divide.

=== Cultural intelligence ===
Developing high cultural intelligence increases one's openness and hardiness when dealing with major differences in culture. Improving one's openness requires both humility when learning from others and inquisitiveness in actively pursuing opportunities to develop one's cultural awareness. Strong hardiness allows one to deal better with stress, cultural shocks and tension when interacting with others in a foreign context.

=== Increased interaction ===
Increasing interaction between two groups of people will help increase mutual understanding and fill in any gaps in knowledge of another group's culture. However, trenched can be changed.

== See also ==
- Intercultural communication
- Cultural assimilation
- Parallel society
- Cultural conflict
