= Lionel Sosa =

Mexican-American advertiser

- Born: Robert Louis Johnson; May 27, 1939 (age 87); San Antonio, Texas, U.S.
- Known for: Advertising executive

Lionel Sosa (born May 27, 1939) is a Mexican-American advertising and marketing executive.

== Biography ==
Sosa grew up in San Antonio, Texas. After graduating from Lanier High School in 1957, Sosa served in the United States Marine Corps. Sosa had long dreamed of being an artist and tried to join the Walt Disney Animation Studios while living in San Clemente, California. He mailed a portfolio of his work to Disney but ran low on funds and had to return to San Antonio after two months. The portfolio was mailed back with a letter stating that the company was "adequately staffed." His first real job after the Marines was for O. P. Schabel; he spent four years emptying and repainting litter cans around San Antonio and was paid $1.75 for each can. During his time with Schnabel, Sosa landed a job with Texas Neon designing neon signs, continuing his work on the litter cans on nights and weekends. Sosa opened his graphic design studio, SosArt, in 1967.

Sosa entered political advertising by supporting John Tower. With Sosa's support, Tower won 37% of the Hispanic vote. The previous Hispanic best vote percent for a statewide republican candidate had been below 8%.

The success of Sosa's agency in the Tower campaign led several national companies, including Bacardi, Coors, and Dr Pepper to seek his advice for reaching the Hispanic audience. In 1980 Sosa created a new Agency, Sosa and Associates (now Bromley Communications), which eventually became the largest Hispanic advertising agency in the United States.

Sosa's experience with Tower led him to become active in presidential politics, serving as an adviser Republican campaigns, such as those of Ronald Reagan and George W. Bush.

Sosa was named one of the twenty five most influential Hispanics in America by Time Magazine. Sosa has also been named to the Texas Business Hall of fame.

In June 2016, Sosa wrote an op-ed in his hometown newspaper calling on the Republican presumptive presidential nominee Donald Trump to apologize for his comments on Mexican immigrants. Sosa stated that it was likely that he would leave the Republican party if Trump won the nomination at the 2016 Republican National Convention. In late August 2016, Sosa joined Gary Johnson's presidential campaign as co-chair of Hispanic outreach. Thereafter, in October 2016, Sosa changed his voting intentions to supporting Hillary Clinton's presidential campaign, as to "make a statement that Donald Trump cannot win."
