= Cross-cultural =

Term with various meanings

Cross-cultural may refer to:

- cross-cultural studies, a comparative tendency in various fields of cultural analysis
- cross-cultural communication, a field of study that looks at how people from differing cultural backgrounds communicate
- any of various forms of interactivity between members of disparate cultural groups (see also cross-cultural communication, interculturalism, intercultural relations, hybridity, cosmopolitanism, transculturation)
- the discourse concerning cultural interactivity, sometimes referred to as cross-culturalism (See also multiculturalism, cosmopolitanism, transculturation, cultural diversity)

== Cross-cultural communication ==
By the 1970s, the field of cross-cultural communication (also known as intercultural communication) developed as a prominent application of the cross-cultural paradigm, in response to the pressures of globalization which produced a demand for cross-cultural awareness training in various commercial sectors.

Cultural communication differences can be identified by 8 different criteria:

1. when to talk;
2. what to say;
3. pacing and pausing;
4. the art of listening;
5. intonation;
6. what is conventional and what is not in a language;
7. degree of indirectness; and
8. cohesion and coherence.

== Cross-cultural pedagogies ==
The appearance of the term in the titles of a number of college readers and writing textbooks beginning in the late 1980s can be attributed to a convergence of academic multiculturalism and the pedagogical movement known as Writing Across the Curriculum, which gave educators in the social sciences greater influence in composition pedagogy. Popular examples included Ourselves Among Others: Cross-Cultural Readings for Writers (1988), edited by Carol J. Verburg, and Guidelines: A Cross Cultural Reading Writing Text (1990), ed. Ruth Spack.

== Cross-cultural studies ==
Cross-cultural studies is an adaptation of the term cross-cultural to describe a branch of literary and cultural studies dealing with works or writers associated with more than one culture. Practitioners of cross-cultural studies often use the term cross-culturalism to describe discourses involving cultural interactivity, or to promote (or disparage) various forms of cultural interactivity.

Cross-culturalism is nearly synonymous with transculturation, a term coined by Cuban writer Fernando Ortiz in the 1940s to describe processes of cultural hybridity in Latin America. However, there are certain differences of emphasis reflecting the social science derivation of cross-culturalism.

The term "cross-culturalism" became prevalent in cultural studies in the late 1980s and 1990s. An early proponent of the term was the Guyanese writer Wilson Harris, who wrote in The Womb of Space (1983), that "cultural heterogeneity or cross-cultural capacity" gives an "evolutionary thrust" to the imagination.

Anthropology exerted a strong influence on the development of cross-culturalism in literary and cultural studies. French anthropologist Claude Lévi-Strauss was a key figure in the development of structuralism and its successor, post-structuralism. Cross-influences between anthropology and literary/cultural studies in the 1980s were evident in works such as James Clifford and George Marcus's collection, Writing Culture: the Poetics and Politics of Ethnography (1986). Harvard anthropologist Clifford Geertz was cited as an influence on literary critics like Stephen Greenblatt, while other literary/cultural scholars turned to works by Victor Turner and Mary Douglas.

Like multiculturalism, cross-culturalism is sometimes construed as ideological, in that it advocates values such as those associated with transculturation, transnationalism, cosmopolitanism, interculturalism, and globalism. Nevertheless, cross-culturalism is a fundamentally neutral term, in that favorable portrayal of other cultures or the processes of cultural mixing are not essential to the categorization of a work or writer as cross-cultural.

Cross-culturalism is distinct from multiculturalism. Whereas multiculturalism deals with cultural diversity within a particular nation or social group, cross-culturalism is concerned with exchange beyond the boundaries of the nation or cultural group. Recent reviews of cross-cultural studies also suggest that they are useful for understanding populations within single geopolitical boundaries.

Cross-culturalism in literary and cultural studies is a useful rubric for works, writers and artists that do not fit within a single cultural tradition. To the extent that cultures are national, the cross-cultural may be considered as overlapping the transnational. The cross-cultural can also be said to incorporate the colonial and the postcolonial, since colonialism is by definition a form of cross-culturalism. Travel literature also makes up a substantial component of cross-cultural literature. Of the various terms, "cross-culturalism" is the most inclusive, since it is free of transnationalism's dependence on the nation-state and colonialism/postcolonialism's restriction to colonized or formerly-colonized regions. This inclusiveness leads to certain definitional ambiguity (albeit one derived from the term culture itself). In practice, "cross-cultural" is usually applied only to situations involving significant cultural divergence. Thus, the term is not usually applied in cases involving crossing between European nations, or between Europe and the United States. However, there is no clear reason why, for example, Alexis de Tocqueville's Democracy in America or even Woody Allen's Annie Hall (in which the protagonist experiences culture shock after traveling to Los Angeles from New York City) could not be considered cross-cultural works.

Although disagreement over what constitutes a "significant" cultural divergence creates difficulties of categorization, "cross-cultural" is nevertheless useful in identifying writers, artists, works, etc., who may otherwise tend to fall between the cracks of various national cultures.

=== Cross-cultural studies in the social sciences ===
The term "cross-cultural" emerged in the social sciences in the 1930s, largely as a result of the Cross-Cultural Survey undertaken by George Peter Murdock, a Yale anthropologist. Initially referring to comparative studies based on statistical compilations of cultural data, the term gradually acquired a secondary sense of cultural interactivity. The comparative sense is implied in phrases such as "a cross-cultural perspective," "cross-cultural differences," "a cross-cultural study of..." and so forth, while the interactive sense may be found in works like Attitudes and Adjustment in Cross-Cultural Contact: Recent Studies of Foreign Students, a 1956 issue of The Journal of Social Issues.

Usage of "cross-cultural" was for many decades restricted mainly to the social sciences. Among the more prominent examples are the International Association for Cross-Cultural Psychology (IACCP), established in 1972 "to further the study of the role of cultural factors in shaping human behavior," and its associated Journal of Cross-Cultural Psychology, which aims to provide an interdisciplinary discussion of the effects of cultural differences.

=== Cross-cultural films ===
- The African Queen
- Anna and the King
- Babel
- Bride and Prejudice
- Jodhaa Akbar
- Mammoth
- Merry Christmas, Mr. Lawrence
- The King and I
- The Last Samurai
- The Man Who Would Be King
- The Namesake
- Outsourced
- Princess Tam Tam

=== Cross-cultural theatre ===
In the early 21st century the term "intercultural theatre" is preferred to "cross-cultural theatre."

==== Companies ====
- International Centre for Theatre Research
- The Bridge Stage of the Arts
- TheatreWorks (Singapore)
- Darpana Academy of Performing Arts

==== Plays and theatre pieces ====
- Homebody/Kabul by Tony Kushner
- Indian Ink by Tom Stoppard
- Madame Butterfly (1900) by David Belasco
- Miss Saigon
- The Mahabharata by Peter Brook
- The Mikado (1885), a comic opera in two acts by Gilbert and Sullivan
- The Gondoliers (1889), a comic opera in two acts by Gilbert and Sullivan

=== Characteristics of cross-cultural narratives ===
Cross-cultural narrative forms may be described in terms of common characteristics or tropes shared by cross-cultural writers, artists, etc. Examples include primitivism, exoticism, as well as culturally specific forms such as Orientalism, Japonisme.

Cross-cultural narratives tend to incorporate elements such as:

- acculturation or resistance to acculturation
- culture shock
- ethnographic description
- overcoming of social obstacles through acculturation, tricksterism, kindness, luck, hard work, etc.
- return home (often accompanied by further culture shock)
- social obstacles such as discrimination, racism, prejudice, stereotypes, linguistic difficulties, linguicism
- travel writing

=== Cross-cultural music ===
Music has long been a central medium for cross-cultural exchange. The cross-cultural study of music is referred to as ethnomusicology.

=== Cross-cultural theatre directors ===
- Peter Brook (United Kingdom)

=== Cross-cultural visual artists ===
- Leonard Tsuguharu Foujita (Japan, France)
- Paul Gauguin (France, Tahiti)
- Isamu Noguchi (United States, Japan, France, India)

=== Cross-cultural writers (autobiography, fiction, poetry) ===
- Meena Alexander (India, Sudan, England, United States)
- Elvia Ardalani (Mexico, United States, Iran)
- Ruth Benedict (United States, Dutch New Guinea, Japan)
- Aimé Césaire (Martinique, France)
- Joseph Conrad (Poland, England, Congo)
- Charles Eastman (Sioux, United States)
- Olaudah Equiano (Igbo, United States, England)
- Lafcadio Hearn (Greece, Ireland, United States, Japan)
- Joseph Heco (Japan, United States)
- Rudyard Kipling (India, England, United States)
- Jhumpa Lahiri (England, United States, India)
- Anna Leonowens (India, England, Thailand, Canada)
- Spike Milligan (India, England, Ireland)
- Yone Noguchi (Japan, United States)
- Marco Polo (Italy, China)
- Victor Segalen (France, China)
- Khal Torabully (France, Mauritius)

== See also ==
- Comparative literature
- Cosmopolitanism
- Cross-cultural leadership
- Cross-cultural narcissism
- Cross-cultural psychiatry
- Cultural agility
- Emotions and culture
- Globalism
- Hybridity
- Interculturalism
- Interculturality
- Negotiation
- Third culture kid
- Transculturation
- Transnationalism
