= Cultural competency training =

Cultural competency training is an instruction to achieve cultural competence and the ability to appreciate and interpret accurately other cultures. In an increasingly globalised world, training in cultural sensitivity to others' cultural identities (which may include race, sexuality, religion and other factors) and how to achieve cultural competence is being practised in the workplace, particularly in healthcare, schools and in other settings.

== Cultural competence ==
Cultural competence refers to an ability to interact effectively with people of different cultures. Cultural competence comprises four components: (a) awareness of one's own cultural worldview, (b) attitude towards cultural differences, (c) knowledge of different cultural practices and worldviews, and (d) cross-cultural skills. Developing cultural competence results in an ability to understand, communicate with, and effectively interact with people across cultures and leads to a 15% decrease in miscommunication. Cultural competence has a fundamental importance in every aspect of a work field and that includes school and government setting. With the amalgamation of different cultures in American society, it has become imperative for teachers and government employees to have some form of cultural competency training.

To attain the goal of cultural competence, cultural sensitivity must be understood. Cultural sensitivity is the knowledge, awareness, and acceptance of other cultures, and includes "the willingness, ability and sensitivity required to understand people with different backgrounds", and acceptance of diversity. Crucially, it "refers to being aware that cultural differences and similarities between people exist without assigning them a value",

== Background ==
To cater to an increasingly globalized society, many hospitals, organizations, and employers may choose to implement forms of cultural competency training methods to enhance transparency between language, values, beliefs, and cultural differences. Training in cultural competence often includes careful consideration of how best to approach people's various forms of diversity. This new-found awareness helps military members, educators, medical practitioners, other workers and citizens to establish equity in their environments, and enhances interrelationships between one another for increased productivity levels. There are numerous theories as to how best to conduct cultural competency training, which are often dependent on the specific environment and type of work.

== Cultural identity ==
When defining the ideas that surround cultural competence training, defining what culture is can help to understand the ideas that shape the concept. Culture is defined as the set of shared attitudes, values, goals, and practices that characterizes an institution or organization. When looking at culture in terms of cultural competence training, certain groups of individuals should be focused on because of their relevance to society. There are many groups that are marginalized and underrepresented; a few examples of concepts that make up one's cultural identity follow. The approach to identity helps to shape the ideas and themes that go into cultural competence training.

=== LGBTQIA ===
The initialism LGBTQIA stands for lesbian, gay, bisexual, transsexual, transgender, queer, intersex, and asexual. This particular group of individuals has faced numerous obstacles and has historical events to highlight the inequalities they face, such as the Stonewall riots. The Stonewall riots became a symbol for the gay liberation movement when police attempted a raid at the Stonewall Inn to arrest the gay and lesbian patrons and the gay community fought back. Numerous systemic oppressions historically and currently target LGBTQIA individuals.

=== Race ===
Race is a sensitive aspect of cultural competency training that requires professionals to be able to identify, acknowledge and value cultural differences. Training on this aspect of cultural competence teaches professionals that to ignore racial differences is a form of microaggression that can help exacerbate racial inequalities. In order to begin to understand intercultural communications, one must understand the historical and social context under which different cultural groups operate. For example, the history related to the cultural genocide of indigenous peoples in North America, understanding the said group's value system, their ways of learning, and logic is essential in being able to understand how certain aspects of their culture may be similar or different from our own. Such distinction must be approached with respect and without ascribing superiority or inferiority to the difference, that is, in a culturally sensitive fashion.

=== Religion ===
Religious differences can play a role in how professionals interact and communicate with others. Religiosity refers to the nature and extent of public and private religious activity, including belief in God, prayer, and place of worship attendance. Religiosity is usually linked to formal religious traditions (such as Christianity), institutions (such as mosques), sacred texts (such as The Book of Mormon), and a definitive moral code (such as the Decalogue). Spirituality can be an important part of religion but can also exist independent of extant faith traditions, involving a variety of more individual subjective beliefs and activities related to the sacred. In this aspect of cultural competence training professionals should learn how to have religious competence. Religious competence refers to skills, practices, and orientations that recognize, explore, and harness patient religiosity to facilitate diagnosis, recovery, and healing. Religious competence involves the learning and deployment of generic competencies, including active listening and a nonjudgmental stance. It is also an overarching orientation, providing a safe place for discussion of religious issues and identities received in a humble, respectful, and empathetic manner.

=== Nationality ===
In terms of nationality, particularly for people who are immigrants, the recent increase in global migration make them an increasingly common demographic everywhere. Though they will have varying cultures as well. It is important for those who are trained to understand both similarities and differences between themselves, and the individual they are helping. With this knowledge, it makes the process of aiding the individual more efficient and successful. Both the past nation the individual has come from, and their journey of immigration as an experience, can shape their mentality. To have specialists with specific nationalities help explain some differences is a helpful strategy.

== In school ==
School is considered to be the second learning home for children. Every year a large number of people come to the United States. These groups of people are often families, including small children. In today's world, cultural competency plays a vital role in shaping the kids future. The United States is not the front runner in cultural competency training amongst children, with Canada and Australia apparently more progressive in this sector. Cultural competency training can be a huge help for the families who are thinking of adopting a foster child, specifically, if that child was born outside of United States. A school is a mixture of different races and cultures and as an educator, one must be sensitive to everyone's needs. Different cultures act uniquely to the different situations, and as an educator, one has to not only value diversity, but also have a strategy for everyone to feel welcomed.

== In the workforce ==
Over the years, there have been new developed ways of practicing cultural competency in the workforce. There are many different methods that would allow assistance in cultural competency such as: global leadership programs, international team building exercises and specific cross-cultural skills training for special executive positions. Having a good grasp on the many different cultures that exist is increasingly becoming a major principle in the workforce. The techniques for cultural competency training must be practiced more than just in class room lecture. Trainers must be extremely educated in this matter to be able to sufficiently train people. They must take notice of their own biases perspective and about the different types cultures that receive discrimination.

== In healthcare ==
In the medical setting, effective communication between clinicians, patients, families and other health care providers is fundamental.

Health disparities refer to gaps in the quality of health and health care across racial, ethnic, and socioeconomic groups. Studies have demonstrated the multiple factors that contribute to health disparities.

Cultural Competence Online for Medical Practice (CCOMP) is an attempt in the United States to address one of the factors - the patient-doctor interaction. The CCOMP project is funded by a grant from the National Institutes of Health (NIH) through the National Heart Lung and Blood Institute (NHLBI). CCOMP offers a clinician's guide to reduce cardiovascular disparities, intended to create effective cross-cultural approaches to care for African-American patients with cardiovascular disease, especially hypertension. Videos with real patient scenarios and case-based modules are aimed at developing this increased awareness.

== Further Acknowledgements ==
- Culturally Sensitive Intervention – Birmingham: a research project of Cooper Green Mercy Hospital and the University of Alabama at Birmingham, funded by Finding Answers: Disparities Research for Change.
- TRUST project, Alabama Collaboration for Cardiovascular Equality (ACCE), funded by NHLBI.
- Health BELIEF Attitudes Survey.
