= Elvia Ardalani =

Mexican writer, poet and storyteller (born 1963)

- Born: June 4, 1963; Heroica Matamoros Tamaulipas, Mexico
- Occupations: professor, writer, poet, and storyteller

Elvia Ardalani or Elvia García Ardalani (born June 4, 1963, in Heroica Matamoros Tamaulipas, Mexico), is a Mexican writer, poet, and storyteller. She is an assistant professor in the Department of Modern languages and Literatures at the University of Texas–Pan American, where she teaches creative writing and Spanish literature.

== Early life ==
For her undergraduate degree, Ardalani studied Psychology at Texas A&M University–Kingsville. She went on to achieve a master's degree in Psychology and Spanish Literature, and a doctorate in pedagogy in 1991.

== Literary work ==
Ardalani was an editor for Hypertext, a literary critic magazine, and was co-editor for the academic journal Letras Hispanas.

Her first book, published in 1989, was titled Por recuerdos viejos, por esos recuerdos (For Memories of Old, for Those Memories). The book was nominated for the José Fuentes Mares Prize for Literature.

Her second book, De cruz y media luna, was published by Tierra de Libros in 1996. The poetry in this collection approaches love as a theme through the lens of transculturation: the Christian world and the Muslim world; the Hispanic world and the Persian world. The poems of this collection also visit the theme of maternity within the context of eroticism, sensuality, and plenitude. This collection underwent a second edition and resulted in a bilingual edition, published by Claves Latinoamericanas in 2006, with the title: De cruz y media luna/From Cross and Crescent Moon. The second edition contains some changes in relation to the first edition.

Her third book, Y comerás del pan sentado junto al fuego (And You Shall Eat from the Bread While Seated by the Fire), was published by Claves Latinoamericans in 2002 and is one of the most significant within her literary works. The poems in this collection revisit the theme of love, although, this time, it appears to be within a semi-biblical context. Critical studies of the work of Ardalani revolve, generally, on the process of transculturation, as well as on the analysis of the referential language in her poetry.

Her fourth book, Miércoles de ceniza (Ash Wednesday), was published by Editorial Miguel Ángel Porrúa in 2007. In 2008 it was nominated for the Carlos Pellicer Iberoamerican Prize in Poetry ("Premio Iberoamericano de Poesía Carlos Pellicer, para obra publicada") for published works.

She also contributes in digital means, like the literary journal El Collar de la Paloma (The Neckring of the Dove), of which she is the editor.

Her work has been published in various journals and anthologies.

In 2023, the city of Matamoros recognised Ardalani for her achievements in literature.

== Awards ==
- 2010 University of Texas System Regents' Outstanding Teaching Award
