= Intercultural relations =

Academic field of social science studies

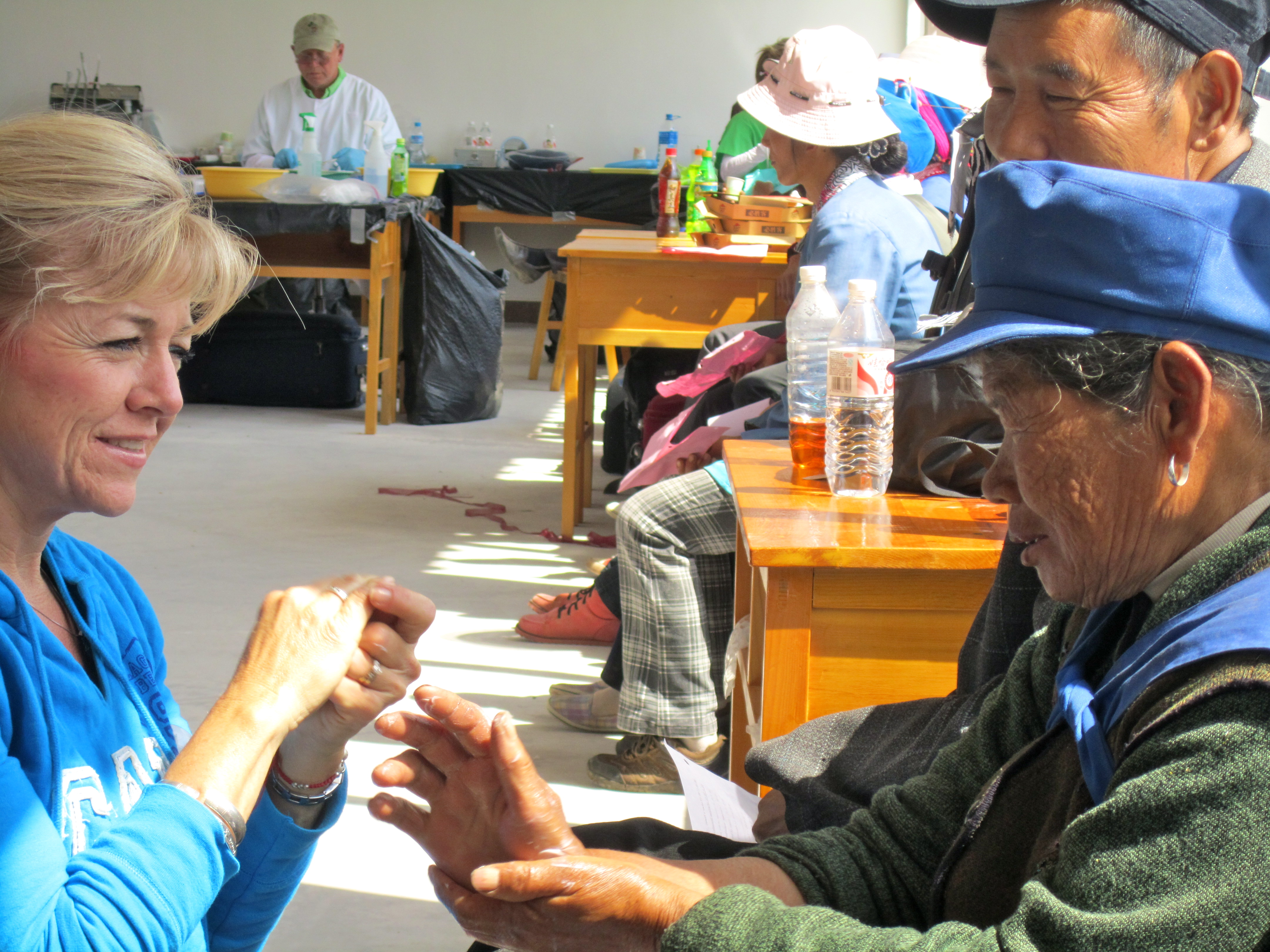
A cross-cultural interaction in Yunnan Province, China

Intercultural relations, sometimes called intercultural studies, is a field of social science. It is a multi-disciplinary academic field designed to train students to understand, communicate, and accomplish specific goals outside their own cultures. Intercultural relations involves, at a fundamental level, learning how to see oneself and the world through the eyes of another. It seeks to prepare students for interaction with cultures both similar to their own (e.g. a separate socioeconomic group in one's own country) or very different from their own (e.g. an American businessman in a small Amazon tribal society). Some aspects of intercultural relations also include, their power and cultural identity with how the relationship should be upheld with other foreign countries.

== Nature ==
The study of intercultural relations incorporates many different academic disciplines. As a field, it is most closely tied to anthropology and sociology, although a degree program in intercultural relations or intercultural studies may also include the study of history, research methods, urban studies, gender studies, public health, many various natural sciences, human development, political science, psychology, religion, missiology, and linguistics or other language training. Often, intercultural programs are designed to translate these academic disciplines into a practical training curricula. Graduate programs will also prepare students for academic research and publication. Especially in today's global and multicultural world, students of intercultural relations can use their training in many fields both internationally and domestically, and often pursue careers in social work, law, community development, religious work, and urban development. Intercultural relations offers the opportunity to direct you in experiencing and learning about the diverse relations within our world.

== History ==
The origins of the practical use of multi-field intercultural relations can be traced back to Christian missionaries seeking to relate the Christian gospel to other cultures in effective, ethical and culturally sensitive ways. Many intercultural studies programs are offered at religious institutions as training for missionaries and religiously motivated international development workers, and therefore often include some training in theology and evangelism. However, in an increasingly globalized world, the broader discipline attracts persons from many backgrounds with many different career goals. Bachelor's, master's, and doctorate degrees are offered in the discipline.

== Topics ==
Some of the main topics of study are:

- Anthropology and Sociology
- Culture Theory
- Development of cultural competence
- Analyzing cultural patterns around the world
- World Religions
- Gender Studies
- Strategies for adapting
- Intercultural communication
- Teaching social skills to reduce cultural misunderstandings
- Research methodology in order to produce academic works and increase access to a culture
- Linguistics
- Intercultural relationships
- Interethnic relationships
- Interracial relationships
- Interreligious relationships

== See also ==
- Developmental Model of Intercultural Sensitivity (DMIS)
- Cross-cultural
- Cultural assimilation
- Cultural diversity
- Ethnocentrism
- Intercultural competence
- Interculturality
- Metacommunicative competence
- Racial integration
- Transculturation
- Intercambio
- Intercultural Universities in Mexico
