= Purnell Model for Cultural Competence =

Model of intercultural competence

The Purnell Model for Cultural Competence is a broadly utilized model for teaching and studying intercultural competence, especially within the nursing profession. Employing a method of the model incorporates ideas about cultures, persons, healthcare and health professional into a distinct and extensive evaluation instrument used to establish and evaluate cultural competence in healthcare. Although the Purnell Model was originally created for nursing students, the model can be applied in learning/teaching, management, study and practice settings, within a range of nations and cultures.

== History and description ==
The Purnell Model for Cultural Competence was developed by Larry D. Purnell and Betty J. Paulanka, as an outline to classify and arrange elements that have an effect on the culture of an individual. The framework uses an ethnographic method to encourage cultural awareness and appreciation in relation to healthcare. It offers a basis for individuals providing care to gain knowledge around concepts and features that relate to various cultures in anticipation of assisting the performance of culturally competent care in clinical settings. The model has been recognised as a way to integrate transcultural proficiency into the execution of nursing and in “primary, secondary and tertiary” environments.

Cultural competence has been described as a process, which is constantly occurring and through which one slowly advances from lacking knowledge to developing it. An individual begins as unconsciously unskilled due to their absence of personal knowledge that they are lacking awareness about other cultures. Next, an individual becomes aware of their incompetence due to their acknowledgement that they have insufficient comprehension of other cultures. Individuals then become deliberately competent (through learning about others’ cultures) so that they are able to apply personalised interventions. Finally, individuals gradually become oblivious to their competence due to their ability to instinctively provide patients with culturally competent care.

In multicultural societies, it is becoming essential for healthcare professionals to be able to provide culturally competent care due to the results of enhanced personal health, as well as the health of the overall population. The greater the overall knowledge a health practitioner has about cultures, the better their ability is to conduct evaluations and in turn provide culturally competent suggestions to patients. Purnell's model requires the caregiver to contemplate the distinct identities of each patient and their views towards their treatment and care.

== The Purnell Model ==
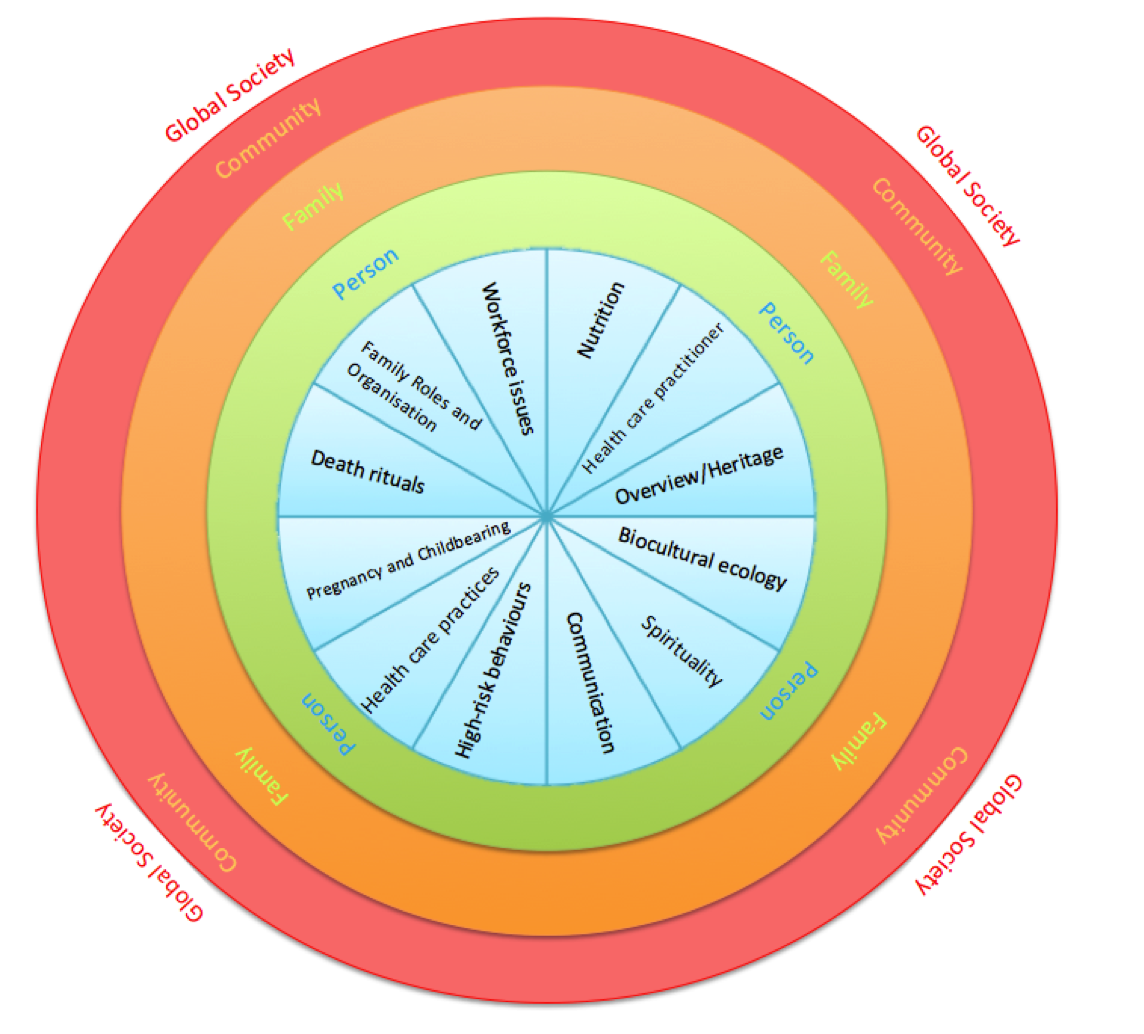
Illustration of the Purnell Model

Purnell and Paulanka proposed this model including four circles of varying sizes that are representative of the metaparadigms that are applied to nursing, as well as a twelve-part inner circle that illustrates the various “cultural domains”.

=== Metaparadigm ideas (outer circles) ===
The outer circles of the model are interconnected metaparadigm ideas that relate to nursing, and are involved within the process of providing an individual with care. The outermost (first) circle is used to represent the global society, the second circle represents the concept of community, the third of family, and the innermost (fourth) circle illustrates the individual person.

==== Global society ====
Global society relates to observing the world as an interconnected whole that consists of a range of individuals from various cultural and ethnic backgrounds. Concepts that are present and influence this unified world include globalisation forces and the rapid growth of communication technologies that impact upon how the global society is maintained. It is critical to consider a person's place within the diverse world community as influencing forces on the global society can impact not only the civilisation, but also an individual's world outlook.

==== Community ====
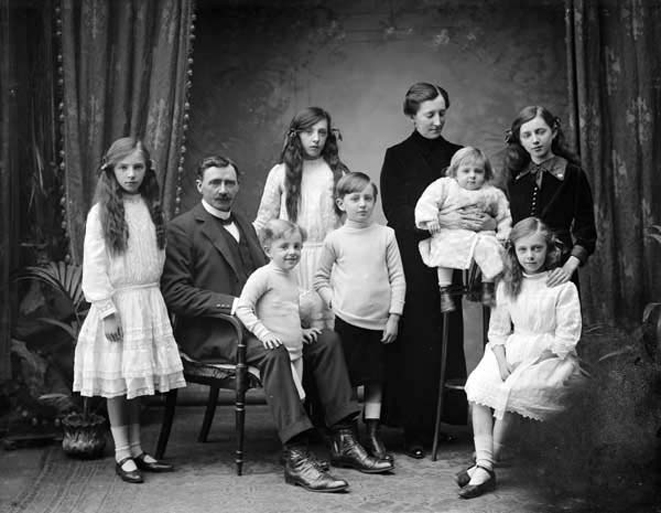
Family group portrait of Mr and Mrs Young of Waterloo House, Waterford, 1913

Community is included in the model, as a metaparadigm, as in the provision of culturally competent care; an individual's situation within a community must be addressed. Through considering a patient's sense of community, care providers acknowledge that different communities may have divergent values, ethics and goals.

==== Family ====
An individual's relationship with their family is essential to consider in the deliverance of care. This is because each individual may want to differently consider/explain who constitutes family, and additionally the degree to which they want family members to be involved in their care may fluctuate.

==== Person ====
Persons must be considered in the performance of culturally competent care, as each individual has their own sense of self, values, beliefs and ideas. Due to every person having their own distinct way of relating to their environment, forming social relationships and communicating with others in their community and broader society. Individual's beliefs and values may impact upon how they wish to be treated.

=== The domains (inner circle) ===
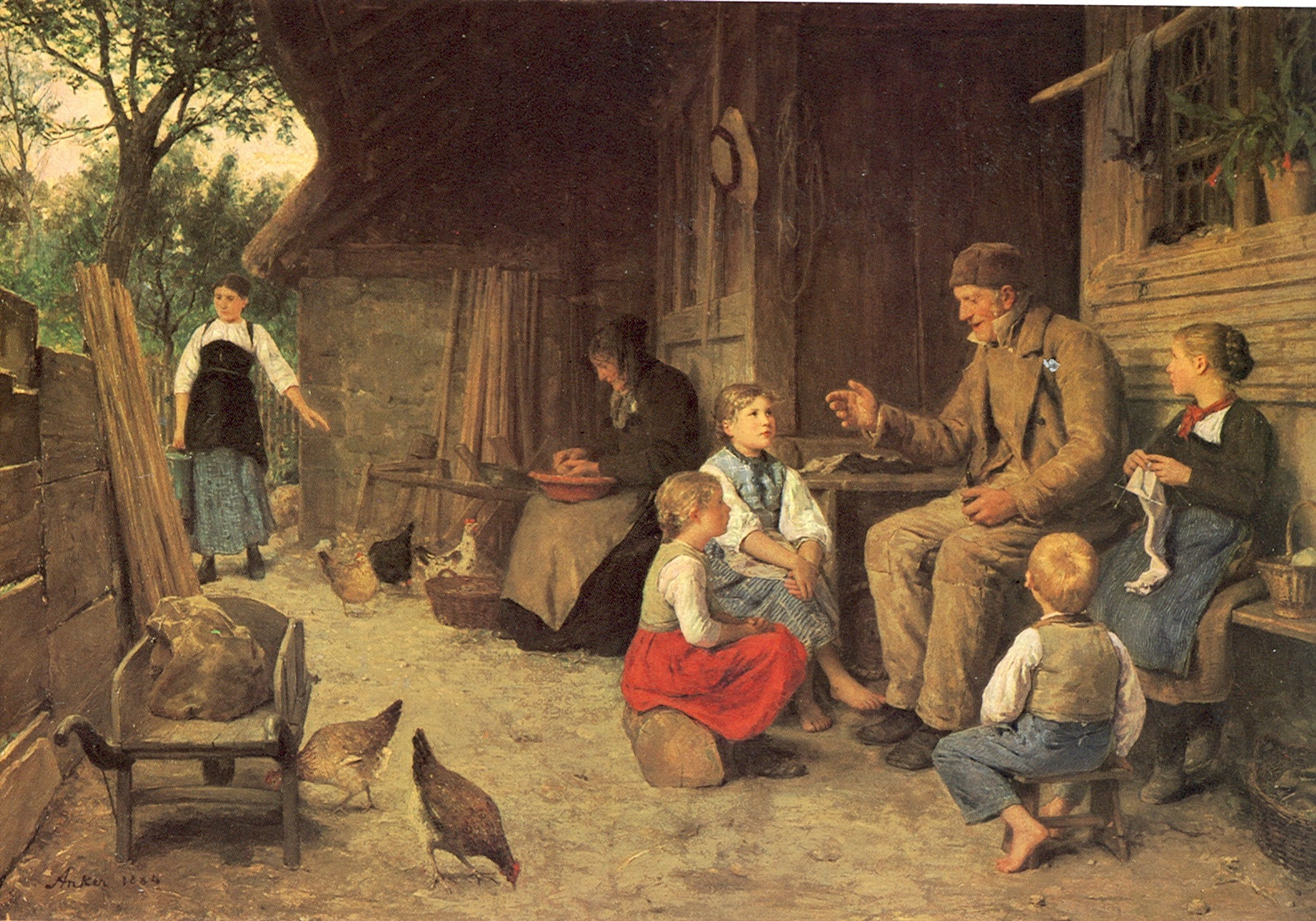
Passing on cultural heritage. 'Grandfather tells a story' Anker Grossvater erzählt eine Geschichte 1884

The twelve inner pieces of the model are cultural domains that are composed of concepts that should be focused upon when evaluating patients. Each of the twelve domains should not be viewed as separate or diverse entities, instead it should recognised that they can influence and inform each other and hence should be viewed as unified parts of a whole.

==== Overview/heritage ====
This domain refers to concepts such as one's origin that are vital in the aptitude of an individual in understanding both themselves and their patients.

==== Communication ====
This construct relates to the interactions an individual has been exposed to throughout their life and socialisation process, for example with family, peers and the wider community. It also conveys the importance of an individual's ability to provide verbal cues such as volume/tone and non-verbal cues such as body language and eye contact.

==== Family roles and organization ====
This domain refers to hierarchies and structures existent within families that may be dependent on gender or age, which have the ability to influence not only family interactions but also the way in which an individual both communicates and acts.

==== Workforce issues ====
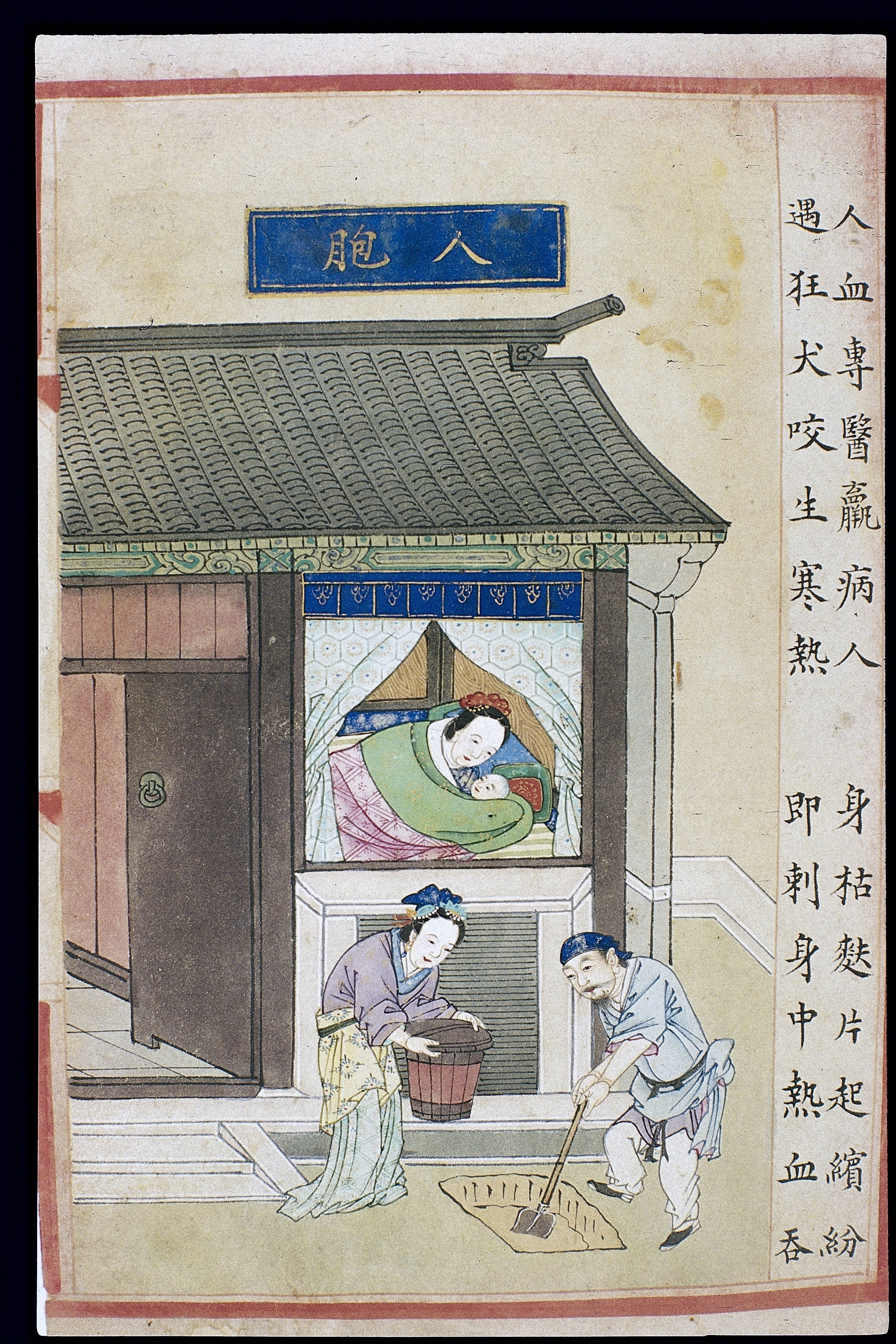
Pregnancy custom in China. Burying the placenta. "It was believed that placing the placenta in a pit in the doorway helped the child to become healthy, powerful, strong, wise and unafraid of strangers." Burying the placenta, C16 Chinese painted book illustration Wellcome L0039985

Workforce issues denotes the way in which aspects present within a workplace such as language barriers, may have an effect on an individual and their sense of being and belonging.

==== Biocultural ecology ====
The concept of biocultural ecology relates to disparities that exist between the diverse range of racial and cultural groups such as biological variations, which need to be considered to gain a greater understanding and appreciation for other cultures.

==== High-risk behaviours ====
High-risk behaviours like consumption of alcohol are vital to consider as they exist within all cultures but the degrees to which they are used and subsequent impacts fluctuate.

==== Nutrition ====
Nutrition should be considered due to variations that exist between different cultures such as food intake and the values of certain foods.

==== Pregnancy and childbearing ====
This concept is important for an individual to understand whilst providing culturally competent care due to the presence of diverse cultural beliefs about pregnancy. There are also various practices and traditions that exist within ethnocultural groups that need to be respected when providing care.

==== Death rituals ====
This domain is fundamental in the deliverance of culturally competent healthcare, as the care provider must recognise patients’ opinions towards death, and their customs towards occasions such as burial ceremonies.

==== Spirituality ====
Spirituality is essential to consider in the acquisition of knowledge about others’ cultures and their practices, for example an individual's views and habits of prayer.

==== Health care practices ====
This domain should be considered in the provision of culturally competent care, as practices like organ transplantation require the comprehension of an individual's situation and necessity for care as well as cultural considerations.

==== Health care practitioner ====
This concept should be considered when providing an individual with care due to there being varying opinions and views that are existent among cultures, for example in relation to health care providers.

=== Centre of model ===
The black circle featured in the centre of the diagram remains vacant to symbolise that which is still unknown.

=== Pointed line ===
The line that is present under the circular figure is representative of the progressions and lapses, which occur to cultural proficiency, that are dependent on situations and occurrences that individuals are confronted with.

== Objectives ==
The Purnell Model for Cultural Competence seeks to accomplish multiple goals towards achieving cultural competence. The model was initially created with the objective of offering a guide in which healthcare professionals could use to aid them in acquiring knowledge about different cultures' ideas and features. The model has been proposed as an approach to help explain situations and occurrences that have the ability to influence the way individual's view culture universally in regards to historical viewpoints. It is also intended to offer a way for social and ethnic data to be examined, through an outline that is representative of human attributes. The model is proposed as a basis for healthcare practitioners to understand patient's interactions and connections in relation to their cultural setting. The overall goal the model was created to attain is to enable the individuals providing care to do so in a way which is thoughtful and skilled, as to encourage consistency as a result of being aware of interdependent cultural features.

== Applications ==
=== Practice ===
The Purnell Model is intended for application in a range of settings/professions including: nursing, physiotherapy, sociology, social work, and in general medical practice. Healthcare practitioners can employ the Purnell model in practice to aid in the provision of culturally competent care to patients. The model can be applied to assist in the improvement and advancement of evaluation instruments, personalised healthcare plans and approaches to designing future strategies. Purnell has noted himself, that the “Oncology Nurses Society” have utilised the framework to create their principles.

=== Learning/teaching ===
The Purnell Model is implemented within nursing programs through the inclusion of cultural outlines and has also been utilised to aid in the gathering of facts and statistics. It has additionally been observed that the framework is employed within undergraduate educational settings and to guide in teaching how to appropriately evaluate a patient's wellbeing. The model is recognised within the coursework for a bachelor's degree in nursing as an outline that can be incorporated into numerous programs.

=== Administration ===
The model has been implemented to assist with employee training in several countries. Administrators in several multicultural workplaces apply the model to encourage and endorse both recognition and acceptance of all staff members, non-dependent on their cultural and ethnic backgrounds. The concept of workforce issues from within the model can be applied in professional settings, to benefit workplace culture and to find a solution to any complications that arise.

=== Research ===
Multiple individuals completing requirements for their studies (e.g., Masters and Doctorate) have applied the model in order to maintain an ethical approach to gathering information and conducting research.

== Strengths ==
The Purnell Model facilitates the potential to acquire information directly relevant to various cultures due to consideration given to each patient's circumstances. Flexibility has been recognised as a critical quality of the model, as it is able to improve the prospective pertinence, of the model, to a range of settings like nursing. The importance of the model is also acknowledged due to its ability to represent multiple outlooks on the world; that assist when providing individuals with culturally competent care. The model has additionally been recognised to incorporate suppositions that are coherent in relation to the model's foundations, as well as containing well-defined explanations of the domains.

Angela Cooper Brathwaite, who has conducted assessments on a variety of cultural competence models, has stated that the model is “comprehensive in content, very abstract, has logical congruence, conceptual clarity, demonstrates clinical utility and espouses the experiential-phenomenological perspective”. The utilisation of a systems theory model is considered to be a beneficial quality of the framework, as well as the non-sequential scale provided to attain cultural competence. Purnell's model is also perceived to have precision and coherence in reference to the clarity of the structure and its comprehensibility for intended users.

== Limitations/weaknesses ==
The Purnell Model does not account for the results that the provision of culturally competent care achieves/fails to achieve, in relation to the patient and their health. This limitation results in a lack of authentication as to whether or not the model is successful in terms of the conduct of the care provider, and the consequences for patients. The model's visual complexity can be seen as a limitation, as it may result in a lack of comprehension and diminish the model's function/value and its applicability. As the framework is methodological, it is considered to be quite abstract, which could detract from the model's utility in practice settings. There is also a conceivable limitation in the instance that the model's material could be simplified beyond practical confines, so that the information provided/directed at an individual could mistakenly be used for an entire populace. The intersecting concepts employed within the model can also be seen as a flaw, as only the minimum as to which is required to justify the concept should be used.
