= Liquid contact indicator =

Device

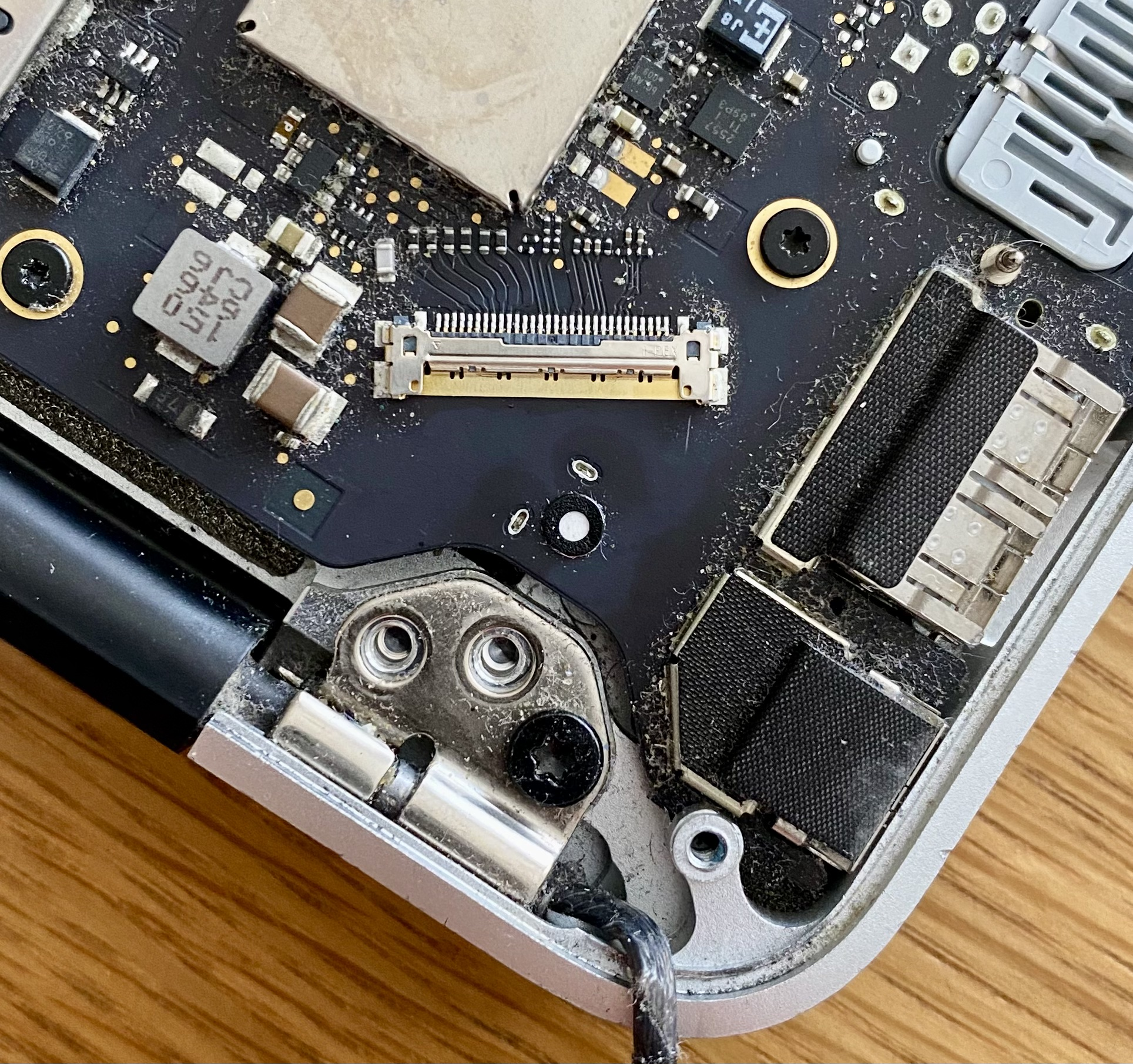
The liquid contact indicator is the white circular object in the middle of this photograph of MacBook Air logic board.

A liquid contact indicator (LCI) is a small device that turns from white into another color, typically red, after contact with water.

These indicators have small adhesives that can be placed on several points, usually near points of egress for liquid, within electronic devices such as laptops and smartphones. This allows service technicians to determine if water damage could have caused damage to the device, allowing them to repair it easier, and/or determine if the device is covered under warranty, as some device's warranties do not cover water damage.

Liquid contact indicators are also known by other names such as water damage tape or sticker, water contact indicator tape, or liquid submersion indicator.

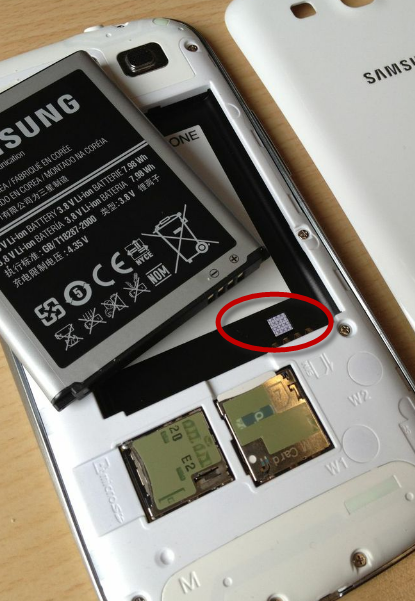
A liquid contact indicator sticker near the battery contacts in a Samsung Galaxy SIII smartphone

== Purpose ==
The main purpose of the liquid contact indicator is to have a lead to the cause of a defect in electronic devices. The manufacturer may not conduct a repair under warranty for a device with an activated LCI. Still there can be reasons for doubt.

- Longer, but not extreme exposure of a device in a humid environment, can trigger a LCI.
- Water can reach the LCI(s), but the electronics around it are unaffected

So, a liquid contact indicator can be triggered, without pointing to liquids causing a defect, with other signs like rust, burn marks or liquid residue being used to confirm the liquid damage

== Forgery ==
In the simplest form, liquid contact indicators are good for a first lead to the cause of defects. LCIs can be replaced and are readily available in online electronic stores. But the other interest, use in warranty claims, make them prone to potential misuse. Therefore, manufacturers introduced LCIs that are harder to reproduce, even with small holographic details.

Some LCIs are only visible under ultraviolet frequencies, making it harder for a would-be forger to detect and replace triggered LCIs.

== Placement ==
Liquid contact indicators are placed on several places in electronic devices, usually near possible points of entry for liquids, like near computer ports, SD card or SIM card slots. Sometimes the liquid contact indicators are placed in such a way that they can be inspected from the outside. For instance there is an LCI in the SIM-card slot of Apple iPhones and in the dock connectors and headphone jacks of iPods made since 2006. In a Samsung Galaxy smartphone there is a LCI underneath the battery cover near the battery contacts.
