= ICI =

ICI or Ici may refer to:

== Companies and organisations ==
- ICI Homes, builder, Florida. US
- Former UK Imperial Chemical Industries
  - ICI Australia, later Orica
- Independent Commission for Infrastructure
- Independent Curators International, New York City, US
- Indian Concrete Institute
- Indian Citation Index
- Institut des cultures d'Islam, Goutte d'Or district, Paris, France
- Institute of Chemistry of Ireland, Irish Chemical Society
- Institute of Cultural Inquiry, US art sponsor
- International Colonial Institute, Brussels, Belgium
- International Commission on Illumination
- International Compact with Iraq, 2007 Iraq-UN
- Investment Company Institute, US
- Islamic Center of Irving, a mosque and Islamic community Center in Irving, Texas, US
- A Woman's Place (bookstore), or Information Center Incorporate

== Media ==
- Ici (magazine) (in French), Montreal, Canada
- Ici Radio-Canada, the name of Canadian Broadcasting Corporation's French-language service from 2013
- ici (radio network), France, formerly France Bleu
- ICI (TV channel) (International Channel/Canal International), Montreal, Canada

== Science and technology ==
- Interactive Compilation Interface
- Intracervical insemination

== Other uses ==
- NATO Istanbul Cooperation Initiative
- Intercultural intelligence, the capability to function effectively in culturally diverse settings
