= Transculturation =

Phenomenon of merging and converging cultures

Transculturation is a term coined by Cuban anthropologist Fernando Ortiz in 1940 to describe the phenomenon of merging and converging cultures. Transculturation encompasses more than transition from one culture to another; it does not consist merely of acquiring another culture (acculturation) or of losing or uprooting a previous culture (deculturation). Rather, it merges these concepts and instead carries the idea of the consequent creation of new cultural phenomena (neoculturation) in which the blending of cultures is understood as producing something entirely new.

Although transculturation is somewhat inevitable, cultural hegemony has historically shaped this process. Particularly, Ortiz referred to the devastating effects of Spanish colonialism on Cuba's indigenous peoples as a "failed transculturation". Further, he affirmed "that when cultures encounter each other, each of the parties invariably exerts a strong influence on the other(s)." Transculturation is often the result of colonial conquest and subjugation. In a postcolonial era, the effects of this oppression remain, as native peoples struggle to regain their own sense of identity. On the other hand, new musical genres have often emerged as a result of transculturation. In reference to Cuba in particular, there exists a mixture between European and African musics as "African slaves left a major imprint on Cuban society, especially in the area of Cuban popular music."

Where transculturation affects ethnicity and ethnic issues, the term "ethnoconvergence" is sometimes used. In a general sense, transculturation covers war, ethnic conflict, racism, multiculturalism, cross-culturalism, interracial marriage, and any other of a number of contexts that deal with more than one culture. In the other general sense, transculturation is one aspect of global phenomena and human events.

The general processes of transculturation are extremely complex—steered by powerful forces at the macrosocial level, yet ultimately resolved at the interpersonal level. The driving force for conflict is simple proximity—boundaries, once separating people (providing for a measure of isolation) become the issue of a conflict when societies encroach upon one another territorially. If a means to co-exist cannot be immediately found, then conflicts can be hostile, leading to a process by which contact between individuals leads to some resolution. Often, history shows us, the processes of co-existence begins with hostilities, and with the natural passing of polarist individuals, comes the passing of their polarist sentiments, and soon some resolution is achieved. Degrees of hostile conflict vary from outright genocidal conquest, to lukewarm infighting between differing political views within the same ethnic community.

These changes often represent differences between homeland pons, and their diasporic communities abroad. Obstacles to ethnoconvergence are not great. The primary issue, language, (hence, communication and education) can be overcome within a single generation—as is evident in the easy acclimation of children of foreign parents. English, for example, is spoken by more non-Anglo-American people than by Anglo-Americans. It has become the current lingua-franca, the worldwide de facto standard international language.

Processes of transculturation become more complex within the context of globalization, given the multiple layers of abstraction that permeate everyday experiences. Elizabeth Kath argues that in the global era we can no longer consider transculturation only in relation to the face-to-face, but that we need to take into account the many layers of abstracted interactions that are interwoven through face-to-face encounters, a phenomenon that she describes as layers of transculturation. Kath draws upon the concept of constitutive abstraction as seen in the work of Australian social theorists Geoff Sharp and Paul James.

== Homogenization versus ethnoconvergence ==
It has been observed that even in monolingual, industrial societies like urban North America, some individuals do cling to a "modernized" primordial identity, apart from others. Some intellectuals, such as Michael Ignatieff, argue that convergence of a general culture does not directly entail a similar convergence in ethnic identities. This can become evident in social situations, where people divide into separate groups, despite being of an identical "super-ethnicity", such as nationality.

Within each smaller ethnicity, individuals may tend to see it perfectly justified to assimilate with other cultures, and some others view assimilation as wrong and incorrect for their culture. This common theme, representing dualist opinions of ethnoconvergence itself, within a single ethnic group is often manifested in issues of sexual partners and marriage, employment preferences, etc. These varied opinions of ethnoconvergence represent themselves in a spectrum; assimilation, homogenization, acculturation, and cultural compromise are commonly used terms for ethnoconvegence which flavor the issues to a bias.

Often it's in a secular, multi-ethnic environment that cultural concerns are both minimised and exacerbated; Ethnic prides are boasted, hierarchy is created ("center" culture versus "periphery") but on the other hand, they will still share a common "culture", and common language and behaviours. Often the elderly, more conservative-in-association of a clan, tend to reject cross-cultural associations, and participate in ethnically similar community-oriented activities. Xenophobes tend to think of cross-cultural contact as a component of assimilation, and see this as harmful.

== Obstacles to ethnoconvergence ==
The obstacle to ethnoconvergence is ethnocentrism, which is the view that one's culture is of greater importance than another's. Ethnocentrism often takes different forms, as it is a highly personal bias, and manifests itself in countless aspects of culture. Religion, or belief, is the prime ethnocentric divider. Second is custom, which often overlaps with religion. With the adherence to each distinct component within ones own culture, comes the repulsion of the other. In most regions, ethnic divides are binary, meaning only two distinct cultures are present, each seeing the other as foreign. Many, however make the point that the binary example is the exception, and the norm is far more dynamic.

Ethnicity can be divided into two distinct areas, as they relate to ethnoconvergence: Utilitarian traits, and traditional customs.

Religion, on the other hand, is a highly personal and attached part of culture. However, religion does not neatly correspond with ethnic identity. In many cosmopolitan societies, religion is everything—social, utilitarian, intellectual, political—from the point of view of people of immersed cultures; the very concept of ethnicity and its distinctions is incongruous to their immersed concepts.

In many societies, such as in those in Europe, languages are considered a significant component of ethnic values. This does not mean that most Europeans reject learning other languages. Quite the contrary, Europeans are often polyglots, and may label other individuals by their ethnicities; practical means of distinguishing cultures may resemble tendencies similar to ethnocentrism.

However, the political and cultural significance of regional or national languages are retained because these polyglots conform to the linguistic norms of the place they visit—doing "as the Romans do". Thus, conforming to the "ethnic integrity" of the region.

It has even become a cliché that "to learn a new language is to adopt a new soul". There are many other examples of the essential significance of language. In pre-Russian Siberia, Tatar-Mongol colonists in the Taiga often recognized indigenous speakers of Turkic languages as their "own people" and non-Turkic groups as "foreigners", despite these indigenous groups having a similar level of material culture, and sharing much of a primitive culture with tribes foreign to the Muslim-Buddhist Tatar-Mongols.

== Transcultural communications ==
In October 2011, U.S. communications agency Bromley launched a new model/strategy utilizing transcultural sociological theory as a means to segment and 'make sense' of the changing American cultural landscape. Returning to classic social science as a solution, Bromley has embraced the anthropological approach put forward by thinkers like Fernando Ortiz as a way to account for ethnicity and language without being limited by them as a way for viewing the world.

== See also ==
- Ángel Rama
- Cross-cultural
- Cultural amalgamation
- Cultural globalization
- Cultural hegemony
- Enculturation
- Intercultural competence
- Intercultural relations
