= Cultural intelligence =

Ability to function in diverse settings

Cultural intelligence or cultural quotient (CQ), refers to an individual's capability to function effectively in culturally diverse settings. The concept was introduced by London Business School professor P. Christopher Earley and Nanyang Business School professor Soon Ang in 2003.

While cultural intelligence is comparable to emotional intelligence (EQ), individuals with a high EQ can grasp "what makes us human and, at the same time, what makes each of us different from one another." In contrast, individuals with a high CQ can discern universal, individual, and non-idiosyncratic features within the behavior of a person or group. The authors cited cognitive, behavioral, motivational, and metacognitive (higher-level reflection) aspects of cultural intelligence.

== Four CQ capabilities ==
The authors described four CQ capabilities: motivation (CQ Drive), cognition (CQ Knowledge), meta-cognition (CQ Strategy), and behavior (CQ Action). CQ Assessments report scores on all four capabilities as well as several sub-dimensions for each capability. Among the four capabilities, motivational CQ, or the interest and enjoyment in cross-cultural interactions, has been identified as a key resource or determinant that enhances personal functioning in cross-cultural environments, leading to improved intercultural adjustment and performance.

== See also ==
- Cosmopolitanism – Idea that all human beings are members of a single community
- Cultural anthropology – Branch of anthropology focused on the study of cultural variation among humans
- Intercultural communication – Discipline that studies communication across different cultures and social groups
- Intercultural competence – Set of behaviours or social skills
- Intelligence cycle – Stages of intelligence information processing
- Multiculturalism – Existence of multiple cultural traditions within a single country
- Organizational culture – Customary behaviours in an organization
