= Interculturalism =

Political movement advocating for cooperation among different cultures

Interculturalism is a political movement that supports cross-cultural dialogue and challenging self-segregation tendencies within cultures. Interculturalism involves moving beyond mere passive acceptance of multiple cultures existing in a society and instead promotes dialogue and interaction between cultures. Interculturalism is often used to describe the set of relations between indigenous and western ideals, grounded in values of mutual respect.

== Origin ==
Interculturalism has arisen in response to criticisms of existing policies of multiculturalism, such as criticisms that such policies had failed to create inclusion of different cultures within society, but instead have divided society by legitimizing segregated separate communities that have isolated themselves and accentuated their specificity. It is based on the recognition of both differences and similarities between cultures. It has addressed the risk of the creation of absolute relativism within postmodernity and in multiculturalism. Interculturalism has been used as a tool of Native American and indigenous rights activists to achieve rights and recognition.

== Definition ==
Philosopher Martha Nussbaum in her work Cultivating Humanity, describes interculturalism as involving "the recognition of common human needs across cultures and of dissonance and critical dialogue within cultures" and that interculturalists "reject the claim of identity politics that only members of a particular group have the ability to understand the perspective of that group". Anthropologist Joanne Rappaport describes interculturalism as consisting of three main threads: a method of connection, a political philosophy aimed at creating utopian indigenous citizenship, and a challenge to traditional ethnography. Rappaport discusses the importance of interculturalism in the Colombian Indigenous movement for human rights and recognition.

== Usage ==
Interculturalism has been included in different national constitutions across Latin America, including Bolivia, Ecuador (2008), Brazil, and across Europe. Colombia includes the concepts of multiculturalism and pluriethnic citizenship in its 1991 constitution. The Ecuadorian constitution has been described as in between both multiculturalism and interculturalism.

The United Nations' agency UNESCO adopted the Convention on the Protection and Promotion of the Diversity of Cultural Expressions in 2005, which declares support for interculturalism. In Germany, all universities are required to have a section on intercultural competence in their social work programs, that involves students being able to be open to listen and communicate with people of different cultural backgrounds, have knowledge of the backgrounds of cultural groups, knowledge of existing stereotypes and prejudices involving cultural groups, and other criteria. Salman Cheema, the Head of Marketing and Communications of the British Council, in an article titled "From Multiculturalism to Interculturalism – A British perspective", spoke of an event co-hosted by the British Council and Canada's Institute for Research on Public Policy (IRPP) in Montreal, Quebec, Canada on April 11, 2013, interculturalist advocate Phil Wood declared that multiculturalism has faced serious problems that need to be resolved through interculturalism, and rejected those opponents of multiculturalism who seek to restore a pre-multiculturalist monoculturalist society. Several days later in Montreal, the New Democratic Party of Canada (NDP) declared support for interculturalism in the preamble of its constitution adopted its federal convention held in Montreal on April 14, 2013.

== Intercultural Health ==
Intercultural health applies the concepts of interculturalism to health settings. It involves conceptualizing health itself as part of a broader cultural framework. Intercultural health defines what counts as "health" as outside purely biomedicine. In many cases, intercultural health is an approach that seeks to reduce gaps between indigenous health and biomedical health systems. Indigenous health systems, sometimes grouped in with alternative medicine, often involve different kinds of healers, plant medicine techniques, holistic medicine, and indigenous knowledge that has been passed down through generations. Intercultural health systems often state the goal of creating better health outcomes in indigenous communities and generating mutual respect between biomedical practitioners and indigenous healers.

The implementation of intercultural health practices is associated with the project of decentralizing health systems, especially in Latin America. Ecuadorian epidemiologist and physician Jaime Breilh is a proponent of intercultural health for its benefits on population health. Structural violence, a term developed by American medical anthropologist and physician Paul Farmer, describes a lack of available health care as a form of violence. Supporters of intercultural health care models cite addressing structural violence as a goal. The goal of many intercultural health models is to treat indigenous knowledge with the same respect as biomedicine. Intercultural health models have been associated with improved health outcomes in indigenous communities.

Effective intercultural health projects involve buy-in from all cultures represented. Anthropologist Catherine Walsh describes the concept of "critical interculturality." She defines this as using indigenous concepts to question the existing structure and advance epistemic change. This type of change requires what anthropologist Linda Tuhiwai Smith calls decolonizing methodologies, which call for a reconsideration of what counts as knowledge. There are examples of intercultural health projects that do not fully incorporate indigenous methodologies and instead continue to perpetuate the western hegemonic order.

Intercultural health projects often involve connecting traditional medicine, or ancestral medicine, or indigenous medicine, with western, biomedicine. A series of case studies highlight intercultural health projects that integrate biomedicine with traditional medicine, in Chile, Ecuador, Bolivia, Colombia, Guatemala, Suriname, and Ghana. Intercultural health education is a priority at the medical school in the Universidad Andina Simón Bolívar in Quito, Ecuador. Intercultural education models have been built into schools in many indigenous communities across the Americas with the goal of passing down aspects of the particular indigenous practices and culture. These are often focused on language acquisition. Peru and Ecuador have both implemented intercultural indigenous language acquisition programs.

Intercultural health concepts applied in United States biomedical settings are often called cultural competency. The explanatory model, the original framework of cultural competency, was developed by Arthur Kleinman. It is a technique grounded in a set of questions that providers can use to understand how a patient understands their own illness. This model has been applied in many US medical schools. Intercultural health projects are seen as distinct from culturally competent ones because of their goal in achieving indigenous political rights and reframing knowledge bases to include indigenous concepts. One of the criticisms of the cultural competency model is that it can create biases among health providers, who might begin to treat patients differently because of their cultural background, without allowing for heterogeneity within a cultural group. It can also lead to worse health outcomes in minority groups when health care providers make assumptions about patients' health behaviors and histories based on their race, ethnicity, or culture. The concept of "witnessing" was developed by Ellen Davenport as a way to overcome cultural competency stereotyping.

== Reception ==
Interculturalism has both supporters and opponents amongst people who endorse multiculturalism. Gerald Delanty views interculturalism as capable of incorporating multiculturalism within it. Ali Rattansi, in his book Multiculturalism: A Very Short Introduction (2011) argues that Interculturalism offers a more fruitful way than conventional multiculturalism for different ethnic groups to co-exist in an atmosphere that encourages both better inter-ethnic understanding and civility; he provides useful examples of how interculturalist projects in the UK have shown in practice a constructive way forward for promoting multi-ethnic civility. Based on a considerable body of research, he also sets out the outlines of a new interpretation of global history which shows that concepts of tolerance are not restricted to the West, and that what is usually regarded as a unique Western cultural achievement should more appropriately be regarded as a Eurasian achievement. He thus offers a more interculturalist view of global history which undermines notions of 'a clash of civilisations'.

In contrast, Nussbaum views interculturalism as distinct from multiculturalism and notes that several humanities professors have preferred interculturalism over multiculturalism because they view multiculturalism as being "associated with relativism and identity politics".

The extent to which the principles of intercultural health are protected in practice under the Ecuadorian constitution are questioned by academics. Some argue that interculturalism creates a binary, whereas pluriculturalism is a more inclusive alternative.

== See also ==
- The Contact Zone (theoretical concept)
- Cosmopolitanism
- Criticism of multiculturalism
- Cross-cultural
- Cross-cultural competence
- Cultural agility
- Intercultural communication
- Intercultural competence
- Intercultural theology
- Intercultural Universities in Mexico
- Polyculturalism
- Toleration
- Transculturation
- Social Medicine
- Foucault's Clinical Gaze
- Critical Epidemiology
