= LCL =

LCL can mean:

== Science, technology, engineering, medicine ==
- Lateral collateral ligament (disambiguation), one of several ligaments located on the lateral side of a joint:
  - Fibular collateral ligament, a ligament of the knee joint
  - Lateral collateral ligament of ankle joint
  - Radial collateral ligament of elbow joint
- Less than container load, a service of freight forwarders for part loads in shared container
- Less-than-car load freight, less than a full boxcar or box motor
- Liquid crystal laser
- Lifted condensation level or lifting condensation level, a meteorological term
- Lazarus Component Library, the Lazarus GUI subsystem, similar to Borland VCL
- Lower control limit, a statistical process control term
- Lymphoblastoid cell line, the outcome of lymphocyte infection by Epstein–Barr virus
- Light Center Length, the distance between the center of the filament (or arc tube) and a reference plane - usually the bottom of the lamp base

== Companies, groups, organizations ==
- LCL S.A., the new name of Crédit Lyonnais, a French bank
- League of Legends Continental League
- Lee County Library (Georgia)
- Liberal and Country League, a political party in Australia
- Lincoln City Libraries, the public library system of Lincoln, Nebraska
- Loblaw Companies Limited, a food retailer in Canada
- London City Lionesses, a football club

== Arts, entertainment, media ==
- Lights, Camera, Lexi! a Disney show
- Laura Coates Live, an editorial pundit, talk and interview show on CNN
- Loeb Classical Library, a series of Greek and Latin texts with English translations

=== Fictional elements ===
- Li C Lik-cheung (李氏力場), a conspiracy theory of a force field located above the area of Hong Kong, invented and built by Li Ka-shing for the purpose of preventing typhoons from negatively affecting the locality
- LCL, source of life, an orange fluid said to be carrying all of the vital elements necessary to make organisms live in Neon Genesis Evangelion

== Other ==
- Labor Contract Law, a 2008 Chinese law intended to protect workers
