= Cultural competence =

Set of behaviours or social skills

Cultural competence, also known as intercultural competence, is a range of cognitive, affective, behavioral, and linguistic skills that lead to effective and appropriate communication with people of other cultures. Intercultural or cross-cultural education are terms used for the training to achieve cultural competence.

== Introduction ==
According to UNESCO, intercultural competence involves a combination of skills, attitudes, and knowledge that enables individuals to navigate cultural differences and build meaningful relationships. UNESCO emphasizes that developing these competencies is essential for promoting peace, tolerance, and inclusion in diverse societies.

Effective intercultural communication comprises behaviors that accomplish the desired goals of the interaction and parties involved. It includes behaviors that suit cultural expectations, situational characteristics, and characteristics of relationship.

== Characteristics ==
Individuals who are effective and appropriate in intercultural situations display high levels of cultural self-awareness and understand the influence of culture on behavior, values, and beliefs. Cognitive processes imply the understanding of situational and environmental aspects of intercultural interactions and the application of intercultural awareness, which is affected by the understanding of the self and own culture. Self-awareness in intercultural interactions requires self-monitoring to censor anything not acceptable to another culture. Cultural sensitivity or cultural awareness leads the individual to an understanding of how their own culture determines feelings, thoughts, and personality.

Affective processes define the emotions that span during intercultural interactions. These emotions are strongly related to self-concept, open-mindedness, non-judgmentalism, and social relaxation. In general, positive emotions generate respect for other cultures and their differences. Behavioral processes refer to how effectively and appropriately the individual directs actions to achieve goals. Actions during intercultural interactions are influenced by the ability to clearly convey a message, proficiency with the foreign language, flexibility and management of behavior, and social skills.

== Creating intercultural competence ==
Intercultural competence is determined by the presence of cognitive, affective, and behavioral abilities that directly shape communication across cultures. These essential abilities can be separated into five specific skills that are obtained through education and experience:

1. Mindfulness: the ability of being cognitively aware of how the communication and interaction with others is developed. It is important to focus more in the process of the interaction than its outcome while maintaining in perspective the desired communication goals. For example, it would be better to formulate questions such as "What can I say or do to help this process?" rather than "What do they mean?"
2. Cognitive flexibility: the ability of creating new categories of information rather than keeping old categories. This skill includes opening to new information, taking more than one perspective, and understanding personal ways of interpreting messages and situations.
3. Tolerance for ambiguity: the ability to maintain focus in situations that are not clear rather than becoming anxious and to methodically determine the best approach as the situation evolves. Generally, low-tolerance individuals look for information that supports their beliefs while high-tolerance individuals look for information that gives an understanding of the situation and others.
4. Behavioral flexibility: the ability to adapt and accommodate behaviors to a different culture. Although knowing a second language could be important for this skill, it does not necessarily translate into cultural adaptability. The individual must be willing to assimilate the new culture.
5. Cross-cultural empathy: the ability to visualize with the imagination the situation of another person from an intellectual and emotional point of view. Demonstrating empathy includes the abilities of connecting emotionally with people, showing compassion, thinking in more than one perspective, and listening actively.

== Assessment ==
The assessment of cross-cultural competence is a field that is rife with controversy. One survey identified 86 assessment instruments for 3C. A United States Army Research Institute study narrowed the list down to ten quantitative instruments that were suitable for further exploration of their reliability and validity.

The following characteristics are tested and observed for the assessment of intercultural competence as an existing ability or as the potential to develop it: ambiguity tolerance, openness to contacts, flexibility in behavior, emotional stability, motivation to perform, empathy, metacommunicative competence, and polycentrism. According to Caligiuri, personality traits such as extroversion, agreeableness, conscientiousness, emotional stability, and openness have a favorable predictive value to the adequate termination of cross-cultural assignments.

=== Quantitative assessment instruments ===
Three examples of quantitative assessment instruments are:

- the Intercultural Development Inventory
- the Cultural Intelligence (CQ) Measurement
- the Multicultural Personality Questionnaire

=== Qualitative assessment instruments ===
Research in the area of 3C assessment, while thin, points to the value of qualitative assessment instruments in concert with quantitative ones. Qualitative instruments, such as scenario-based assessments, are useful for gaining insight into intercultural competence.

Intercultural coaching frameworks, such as the ICCA (Intercultural Communication and Collaboration Appraisal), do not attempt an assessment; they provide guidance for personal improvement based upon the identification of personal traits, strengths, and weaknesses.

== Healthcare ==
The provision of culturally tailored health care can improve patient outcomes. In 2005, California passed Assembly Bill 1195 that requires patient-related continuing medical education courses in California medical school to incorporate cultural and linguistic competence training in order to qualify for certification credits. In 2011, HealthPartners Institute for Education and Research implemented the EBAN Experience™ program to reduce health disparities among minority populations, most notably East African immigrants.

These initiatives demonstrate the application of cultural competency in healthcare through training and practicing strategies. The cultural competency wheel provides a complex structure that can be used in assessing development across many domains, such as critical thinking, relationship building, and knowledge. This enables healthcare workers to apply their new sense of cultural competency more effectively. Further research expands on methods for implementing cultural competency. Additional strategies for implementing competency include interpreter services, working alongside traditional healers, exposure to another culture, and community-based support. These strategies are intended to improve communication and reduce health differences. However, research on cultural competency identifies several limitations when applied. The models may oversimplify cultures, generalizing them based on characteristics, and these methods aren't taught to be a standard or given enough consistency. These limitations give light onto challenges in effectively implementing cultural competency across the healthcare industry.

== Cross-cultural competence ==
Cross-cultural competence (3C) has generated confusing and contradictory definitions because it has been studied by a wide variety of academic approaches and professional fields. One author identified eleven different terms that have some equivalence to 3C: cultural savvy, astuteness, appreciation, literacy or fluency, adaptability, terrain, expertise, competency, awareness, intelligence, and understanding. The United States Army Research Institute, which is currently engaged in a study of 3C has defined it as "A set of cognitive, behavioral, and affective/motivational components that enable individuals to adapt effectively in intercultural environments".

Organizations in academia, business, health care, government security, and developmental aid agencies have all sought to use 3C in one way or another. Poor results have often been obtained due to a lack of rigorous study of 3C and a reliance on "common sense" approaches.

Cross-cultural competence does not operate in a vacuum, however. One theoretical construct posits that 3C, language proficiency, and regional knowledge are distinct skills that are inextricably linked, but to varying degrees depending on the context in which they are employed. In educational settings, Bloom's affective and cognitive taxonomies serve as an effective framework for describing the overlapping areas among these three disciplines: at the receiving and knowledge levels, 3C can operate with near-independence from language proficiency and regional knowledge. But, as one approaches the internalizing and evaluation levels, the overlapping areas approach totality.

The development of intercultural competence is mostly based on the individual's experiences while he or she is communicating with different cultures. When interacting with people from other cultures, the individual experiences certain obstacles that are caused by differences in cultural understanding between two people from different cultures. Such experiences may motivate the individual to acquire skills that can help him to communicate his point of view to an audience belonging to a different cultural ethnicity and background.

=== Intercultural competence models ===
Intercultural Communicative Language Teaching Model. In response to the needs to develop EFL learners' ICC in the context of Asia, a theoretical framework, which is an instructional design (ISD) model ADDIE with five stages (Analyze – Design – Develop – Implement – Evaluate) is employed as a guideline in order to construct the ICLT model for EFL learners. The ICLT model is an on-going process of ICC acquisition. There are three parts: Language-Culture, the main training process.

(Input – Notice – Practice – Output), and the ICC, which are systematically integrated. The second part is the main part consisting of four teaching steps to facilitate learners' ICC development, and each step reflects a step of the knowledge scaffolding and constructing process to facilitate learners' ICC development.

=== Immigrants and international students ===
A salient issue, especially for people living in countries other than their native country, is the issue of which culture they should follow: their native culture or the one in their new surroundings.

International students also face this issue: they have a choice of modifying their cultural boundaries and adapting to the culture around them or holding on to their native culture and surrounding themselves with people from their own country. The students who decide to hold on to their native culture are those who experience the most problems in their university life and who encounter frequent culture shocks. But international students who adapt themselves to the culture surrounding them (and who interact more with domestic students) will increase their knowledge of the domestic culture, which may help them to "blend in" more. In the article it stated, "Segmented assimilation theorists argue that students from less affluent and racial and ethnic minority immigrant families face a number of educational hurdles and barriers that often stem from racial, ethnic, and gender biases and discrimination embedded within the U.S. public school system". Such individuals may be said to have adopted bicultural identities.

Cultural competency training for teachers has been explored in how educators support their immigrant and international students. Research has found that teachers who participate in multicultural teachings demonstrate changes in attitudes and classroom practices, including increased engagement with students and their families, which in turn strengthened student and teacher interactions and incorporated race and diversity into the classroom discussions. This research continues to inform multicultural teacher education.

=== Ethnocentrism ===
Another issue that stands out in intercultural communication is the attitude stemming from ethnocentrism. LeVine and Campbell defines ethnocentrism as people's tendency to view their culture or in-group as superior to other groups, and to judge those groups to their standards. With ethnocentric attitudes, those incapable to expand their view of different cultures could create conflict between groups. Ignorance to diversity and cultural groups contributes to prevention of peaceful interaction in a fast-paced globalizing world. The counterpart of ethnocentrism is ethnorelativism: the ability to see multiple values, beliefs, norms etc. in the world as cultural rather than universal; being able to understand and accept different cultures as equally valid as ones' own. It is a mindset that moves beyond in-group out-group to see all groups as equally important and valid and individuals to be seen in terms of their own cultural context.

== Cultural differences ==
There is several approaches to determine and measure cultural dimensions. Among them the following can be found in academia: Kluckhohn/ Strodtbeck (Early pioneers), Etward T. Hall (Focus on Context Communication and Time-Perception, a.o.), Geert Hofstede (Widely known author discussed below), Fons Trompenaars (Well known in business), and the Globe Study (well established in research). According to Hofstede's cultural dimensions theory, cultural characteristics can be measured along several dimensions. The ability to perceive them and to cope with them is fundamental for intercultural competence. These characteristics include:

=== Individualism versus collectivism ===
- Collectivism
  - Decisions are based on the benefits of the group rather than the individual;
  - Strong loyalty to the group as the main social unit;
  - The group is expected to take care of each individual;
  - Collectivist cultures include Pakistan, India, and Guatemala.
- Individualism
  - Autonomy of the individual has the highest importance;
  - Promotes the exercise of one's goals and desires and so value independence and self-reliance;
  - Decisions prioritize the benefits of the individual rather than the group;
  - Individualistic cultures are Australia, Belgium, the Netherlands, and the United States.

=== Masculinity versus femininity ===
- Masculine Cultures
  - Value behaviors that indicate assertiveness and wealth;
  - Judge people based on the degree of ambition and achievement;
  - General behaviors are associated with male behavior;
  - Sex roles are clearly defined and sexual inequality is acceptable;
  - Masculine cultures include Austria, Italy, Japan, and Mexico.
- Feminine Cultures
  - Value behaviors that promote the quality of life such as caring for others and nurturing;
  - Gender roles overlap and sexual equality is preferred as the norm;
  - Nurturing behaviors are acceptable for both women and men;
  - Feminine cultures are Chile, Portugal, Sweden, and Thailand.

=== Uncertainty avoidance ===
- Reflects the extent to which members of a society attempt to cope with anxiety by minimizing uncertainty;
- Uncertainty avoidance dimension expresses the degree to which a person in society feels comfortable with a sense of uncertainty and ambiguity.
- Uncertainty avoidance has been used to explain how individuals from different cultures respond to ambiguity, including preferences for clear instructions and structured decision-making. This is reflected in differences between high and low uncertainty avoidance cultures, which vary in their attitudes towards rules, structure, and change.
  - High uncertainty avoidance cultures
    - Countries exhibiting high Uncertainty Avoidance Index or UAI maintain rigid codes of belief and behavior and are intolerant of unorthodox behavior and ideas;
    - Members of society expect consensus about national and societal goals;
    - Society ensures security by setting extensive rules and keeping more structure;
    - High uncertainty avoidance cultures are Greece, Guatemala, Portugal, and Uruguay.
  - Low uncertainty avoidance cultures
    - Low UAI societies maintain a more relaxed attitude in which practice counts more than principles;
    - Low uncertainty avoidance cultures accept and feel comfortable in unstructured situations or changeable environments and try to have as few rules as possible;
    - People in these cultures are more tolerant of change and accept risks;
    - Low uncertainty avoidance cultures are Denmark, Jamaica, Ireland, and Singapore.

=== Power distance ===
- Refers to the degree in which cultures accept unequal distribution of power and challenge the decisions of power holders;
- Depending on the culture, some people may be considered superior to others because of a large number of factors such as wealth, age, occupation, gender, personal achievements, and family history.
  - High power distance cultures
    - Believe that social and class hierarchy and inequalities are beneficial, that authority should not be challenged, and that people with higher social status have the right to use power;
    - Cultures with high power distance are Arab countries, Guatemala, Malaysia, and the Philippines.
  - Low power distance cultures
    - Believe in reducing inequalities, challenging authority, minimizing hierarchical structures, and using power just when necessary;
    - Low power distance countries are Austria, Denmark, Israel, and New Zealand.

=== Short-term versus long-term orientation ===
- Short-term or Monochronic Orientation
  - Cultures value tradition, personal stability, maintaining "face", and reciprocity during interpersonal interactions
  - People expect quick results after actions
  - Historical events and beliefs influence people's actions in the present
  - Monochronic cultures are Canada, Philippines, Nigeria, Pakistan, and the United States
- Long-term or Polychronic Orientation
  - Cultures value persistence, thriftiness, and humility
  - People sacrifice immediate gratification for long-term commitments
  - Cultures believe that past results do not guarantee for the future and are aware of change
  - Polychronic cultures are China, Japan, Brazil, and India

== Criticisms ==
Although its goal is to promote understanding between groups of individuals that, as a whole, think differently, it may fail to recognize specific differences between individuals of any given group. Such differences can be more significant than the differences between groups, especially in the case of heterogeneous populations and value systems.

Madison has criticized the tendency of 3C training for its tendency to simplify migration and cross-cultural processes into stages and phases.

== See also ==
- Allophilia
- Anthropologist
- Bennett scale
- Cross-cultural communication
- Cultural assimilation
- Cultural behavior
- Cultural diversity
- Cultural identity
- Cultural intelligence
- Cultural pluralism
- Cultural safety
- Existential migration
- Adab (Islamic etiquette)
- Faux pas
- Interaction
- Intercultural communication
- Intercultural communication principles
- Intercultural relations
- Interculturalism
- Interpersonal communication
- Montreal–Philippines cutlery controversy
- Multiculturalism
- Proxemics
- Purnell Model for Cultural Competence
- Social constructionism
- Social identity
- Transculturation
- Worldwide etiquette
- Xenocentrism
