= Japanese prosody =

Prosody in Japanese serves many communicative purposes: conveying pragmatic functions, marking lexical identity, and expressing the speaker's social identity, among others.

As in other languages, the prosody of Japanese involves features such as pitch, loudness, duration, phonetic reduction, and voice qualities such as creakiness and breathiness. However the ways that these features combine to form meaningful patterns are often unique to Japanese.

== Social rituals ==
inai-inai-ba, the Japanese equivalent of peek-a-boo, with its characteristic response-cuing prosody

Prosody is an essential part of many common interaction patterns. For example, in the peek-a-boo game, babies as early as 9 month recognize the prosody of inai-inai-ba and respond, perhaps with a laugh and a wiggle. Other fixed phrases may also have their own fixed prosody, such as gommennasi (I'm sorry), nakanaide (don't cry), and many greetings. There are also more general prosodic patterns, such as one for cuing the listener to show that they're still listening, which commonly evokes an un (uh-huh) or other backchannel response. There are also prosodic patterns for pragmatic functions such as marking contrast, praising, joking, marking various types of questions, and so on.

== Lexical identity ==
kiji (pheasant) and kiji (dough), two Japanese words distinguished by pitch accent

ame (candy) and ame (rain), two Japanese words distinguished by pitch accent

Most Japanese words have a pitch-accent pattern specifying which morae are high and low in pitch. This can often be described concisely by specifying the location of the pitch fall, at least for the Tokyo dialect. Thus ki┐ji, meaning dough, has a pitch fall between the syllables, in contrast to kiji meaning pheasant, which does not, and similarly for a┐me and ame, meaning rain and candy, respectively.

For learners of Japanese, lexical accent can be a challenge. It is seldom predictable and thus must be memorized, word-by-word; it interacts in complex ways with morphology and syntax; and it varies across dialects. Because the functional load of lexical accent is not high, lexical accent errors seldom prevent communication, but proper lexical accent is highly valued by native speakers.

== Social identity ==
Prosody is also involved in marking social roles and social relations, such as hierarchical relations and gender roles.

== See also ==
- English prosody
