= Trompenaars's model of national culture differences =

Framework for cross-cultural communication

7 dimensions of culture

Trompenaars's model of national culture differences is a framework for cross-cultural communication applied to general business and management, developed by Fons Trompenaars and Charles Hampden-Turner. This involved a large-scale survey of 8,841 managers and organization employees from 43 countries.

This model of national culture differences has seven dimensions. There are five orientations covering the ways in which human beings deal with each other, one which deals with time, and one which deals with the environment. The first five of Trompenaars’ dimensions are Talcott Parsons's pattern variables; the other two of Trompenaars’ dimensions are taken from Kluckholn and Strodtbeck's dimensions of culture.

== Universalism vs particularism ==
Universalism is the belief that ideas and practices can be applied everywhere without modification, while particularism is the belief that circumstances dictate how ideas and practices should be applied. It asks the question, What is more important, rules or relationships? Cultures with high universalism see one reality and focus on formal rules. Business meetings are characterized by rational, professional arguments with a "get down to business" attitude. Trompenaars research found there was high universalism in countries like the United States, Canada, UK, Australia, Germany, and Sweden. Cultures with high particularism see reality as more subjective and place a greater emphasis on relationships. It is important to get to know the people one is doing business with during meetings in a particularist environment. Someone from a universalist culture would be wise not to dismiss personal meanderings as irrelevancies or mere small talk during such business meetings. Countries that have high particularism include Venezuela, Indonesia, China, South Korea, and the former Soviet Union.

== Individualism vs communitarianism ==
Individualism refers to people regarding themselves as individuals, while communitarianism refers to people regarding themselves as part of a group. Trompenaars research yielded some interesting results and suggested that cultures may change more quickly than many people realize. It may not be surprising to see a country like the United States with high individualism, but Mexico and the former communist countries of Czechoslovakia and the Soviet Union were also found to be individualistic in Trompenaars research. In Mexico, the shift from a previously communitarian culture could be explained with its membership in NAFTA and involvement in the global economy. This contrasts with Hofstede's earlier research, which found these countries to be collectivist, and shows the dynamic and complex nature of culture. Countries with high communitarianism include Germany, China, France, Japan, and Singapore.

== Neutral vs emotional ==
A neutral culture is a culture in which emotions are held in check whereas an emotional culture is a culture in which emotions are expressed openly and naturally. Neutral cultures that come rapidly to mind are those of the Japanese and British. Some examples of high emotional cultures are the Netherlands, Mexico, Italy, Israel and Spain. In emotional cultures, people often smile, talk loudly when excited, and greet each other with enthusiasm. So, when people from neutral culture are doing business in an emotional culture they should be ready for a potentially animated and boisterous meeting and should try to respond warmly. As for those from an emotional culture doing business in a neutral culture, they should not be put off by a lack of emotion.

== Specific vs diffuse ==
A specific culture is one in which individuals have a large public space they readily share with others and small private space they guard closely and share with only close friends and associates. A diffuse culture is one in which public space and private space are similar in size and individuals guard their public space carefully, because entry into public space affords entry into private space as well. It looks at how separate a culture keeps their personal and public lives. Fred Luthans and Jonathan Doh give the following example which explains this:

An example of these specific and diffuse cultural dimensions is provided by the United States and Germany. A U.S. professor, such as Robert Smith, PhD, generally would be called “Doctor Smith” by students when at his U.S. university. When shopping, however, he might be referred to by the store clerk as “Bob,” and he might even ask the clerk’s advice regarding some of his intended purchases. When golfing, Bob might just be one of the guys, even to a golf partner who happens to be a graduate student in his department. The reason for these changes in status is that, with the specific U.S. cultural values, people have large public spaces and often conduct themselves differently depending on their public role. At the same time, however, Bob has private space that is off-limits to the students who must call him “Doctor Smith” in class. In high-diffuse cultures, on the other hand, a person’s public life and private life often are similar. Therefore, in Germany, Herr Professor Doktor Schmidt would be referred to that way at the university, local market, and bowling alley—and even his wife might address him formally in public. A great deal of formality is maintained, often giving the impression that Germans are stuffy or aloof.

== Achievement vs ascription ==
In an achievement culture, people are accorded status based on how well they perform their functions. In an ascription culture, status is based on who or what a person is. Does one have to prove themself to receive status or is it given to them? Achievement cultures include the US, Austria, Israel, Switzerland and the UK. Some ascription cultures are Venezuela, Indonesia, and China. When people from an achievement culture do business in an ascription culture it is important to have older, senior members with formal titles and respect should be shown to their counterparts. However, for an ascription culture doing business in an achievement culture, it is important to bring knowledgeable members who can prove to be proficient to other group, and respect should be shown for the knowledge and information of their counterparts.

== Sequential vs synchronic ==
A sequential time culture is the one in which the people like events to happen in a chronological order. Punctuality is very much appreciated and they base their lives in schedules, plannification and specific and clear deadlines; in this kind of cultures time is very important and they do not tolerate the waste of time. Instead in synchronic cultures, they see specific time periods as interwoven periods, the use to highlight the importance of punctuality and deadlines if these are key to meeting objectives and they often work in several things at a time, they are also more flexible with the distribution of time and commitments.

== Internal vs external control ==
Do we control our environment or are we controlled by it? In inner directed culture, people believe in controlling outcomes and have a dominant attitude toward environment. In outer-directed culture, people believe in letting things take their own course and have a more flexible attitude, characterized by a willingness to compromise and maintain harmony with nature.

== See also ==
- Cross-cultural communication
- Fons Trompenaars
- Hofstede's cultural dimensions theory
