= Speech tempo =

Rate or speed at which a language is spoken

Speech tempo is a measure of the number of speech units of a given type produced within a given amount of time. Speech tempo is believed to vary within the speech of one person according to contextual and emotional factors, between speakers and also between different languages and dialects. However, there are many problems involved in investigating this variance scientifically.

== Problems of definition ==
While most people seem to believe that they can judge how quickly someone is speaking, it is generally said that subjective judgements and opinions cannot serve as scientific evidence for statements about speech tempo; John Laver has written that analyzing tempo can be "dangerously open to subjective bias ... listeners' judgements rapidly begin to lose objectivity when the utterance concerned comes either from an unfamiliar accent or ... from an unfamiliar language". Scientific observation depends on accurate segmenting of recorded speech along the time course of an utterance, usually using one of the acoustic analysis software tools available on the internet such as Audacity or, specifically for speech research, Praat.

Measurements of speech tempo can be strongly affected by pauses and hesitations. For this reason, it is usual to distinguish between speech tempo including pauses and hesitations and speech tempo excluding them. The former is called speaking rate and the latter articulation rate.

Various units of speech have been used as a basis for measurement. The traditional measure of speed in typing and Morse code transmission has been words per minute (wpm). However, in the study of speech the word is not well defined (being primarily a unit of grammar), and speech is not usually temporally stable over a period as long as a minute. Many studies have used the measure of syllables per second, but this is not completely reliable because, although the syllable as a phonological unit of a given language is well-defined, it is not always possible to get agreement on the phonetic syllable. For example, the English word 'particularly' in the form in which it occurs in dictionaries is, phonologically speaking, composed of five syllables /pə.tɪk.jə.lə.li/. Phonetic realizations of the word, however, may be heard as comprising five [pə.tɪk.jə.lə.li], four [pə.tɪk.jə.li], three [pə.tɪk.li] or even two syllables [ptɪk.li], and listeners are likely to have different opinions about the number of syllables heard.

An alternative measure that has been proposed is that of sounds per second. One study found rates varying from an average of 9.4 sounds per second for poetry reading to 13.83 per second for sports commentary. The problem with this approach is that the researcher must be clear as to whether the "sounds" s/he is counting are phonemes or physically observable phonetic units (sometimes called "phones"). As an example, the utterance 'Don't forget to record it' might in slow, careful speech be pronounced /dəʊnt fəget tə rɪkɔːd ɪt/, with 19 phonemes, each of which is phonetically realized. When the sentence is said at high speed it might be pronounced as [də̃ʊ̃ʔ fɡeʔtrɪkɔːd ɪt], with 16 units. If we are counting only units that can be observed and measured, it is clear that at faster speeds of utterance the number of sounds produced per second does not necessarily increase.

== Within-speaker variability ==
Speakers vary their speed of speaking according to contextual and physical factors. A typical speaking rate for English is 4 syllables per second, but in different emotional or social contexts the rate may vary, one study reporting a range between 3.3 and 5.9 syl/sec, Another study found significant differences in speaking rate between story-telling and taking part in an interview.

Speech tempo may be regarded as one of the components of prosody. Possibly the most detailed analytical framework for the role of tempo in English prosody is that of David Crystal. His system, which uses terms mostly borrowed from musical usage, allows for simple variation away from normal in tempo, where monosyllables may be pronounced as "clipped", "drawled" or "held" and polysyllabic utterances may be spoken at "allegro", "allegrissimo", "lento" and "lentissimo". Complex variation includes "accelerando" and "rallentando". Crystal claims that "tempo has probably the most highly discrete grammatical function of all prosodic parameters other than pitch ...". He cites from his corpus-based analysis instances of increased tempo in cases of speakers' self-corrections of speech errors, and in citing embedded material in the form of titles and names, e.g. "I'm sorry, but we won't be able to start So you think you know what's happening for a few moments" and "This is the I'll show you a picture and you tell me what it is technique" (where the italicized text is spoken at faster tempo).

== Between-language differences ==
Subjective impressions of tempo differences between different languages and dialects are difficult to substantiate with scientific data. Counting syllables per second will result in differences caused by the different syllable structures found in different languages; many languages have a predominantly CV (consonant+vowel) syllable structure while English syllables may begin with up to 3 consonants and end with up to 4. Consequently, it is likely that a Japanese speaker can produce more syllables in their language per second than an English speaker can in theirs. Counting sounds per second is also problematic for the reason mentioned above, i.e. that the researcher needs to be sure what objects it is that they are counting.

Howard Giles has studied the relationship between perceived tempo and perceived competence of speakers of different accents of English, and found a positive linear relationship between the two (i.e. people who speak faster are perceived as more competent).

Osser and Peng counted sounds per second for Japanese and English and found no significant difference. The study by Kowal et al., referred to above, comparing story-telling with speaking in an interview, looked at English, Finnish, French, German and Spanish. They found no significant differences in rate between the languages, but highly significant differences between the speaking styles. Similarly, Barik found that differences in tempo between French and English were due to speaking style rather than to the language. From the point of view of the perception of tempo differences between languages, Vaane used spoken Dutch, English, French, Spanish and Arabic produced at three different rates and found that untrained and phonetically trained listeners performed equally well at judging the rate of speaking for familiar and unfamiliar languages.

In the absence of reliable evidence to support it, it seems that the widespread view that some languages are spoken more rapidly than others is an illusion. This illusion may well be related to other factors such as differences of rhythm and pausing. In another study, an analysis of speech rate and perception in radio bulletins, the average rate of bulletins varied from 168 (English, BBC) to 210 words per minutes (Spanish, RNE).

== See also ==
- Isochrony

== Bibliography ==
- Roach, P. (1998). 'Some languages are spoken more quickly than others', in L. Bauer and P. Trudgill (eds) Language Myths, pp. 150–158. ISBN 014-02-6023-4
