= Richard D. Lewis =

British author

- Born: July 13, 1930 (age 96); Billinge Higher End, Wigan, England
- Occupations: Chairman, Richard Lewis Communications Ltd

Richard Donald Lewis (born 1930) is an English communication consultant, writer, and social theorist. He is chiefly known for his "Lewis Model of Cross-Cultural Communication."

== Early life ==
Richard Donald Lewis was born in Billinge, Lancashire on 13 July 1930. He is descended from a long line of coal miners, originally from Mold, North Wales.

After completing his schooling in Lancashire, Lewis went on to study Modern Languages at the University of Nottingham and also gained a diploma in Cultures and Civilisations from the Sorbonne in Paris. After attending the 1952 Olympic Games in Helsinki, Lewis spent the next two years living and working in Finland, where he learnt to speak Finnish and also came to know and love the Finnish people and culture.

== Career ==
He founded the Berlitz School of Languages in Finland in 1955, and later opened a further 5 schools in Finland. In addition, he opened Berlitz schools in Norway in 1958 and in Portugal in 1959.

In 1966, Lewis founded the Berlitz School in Tokyo and spent the next 5 years living and working in Japan, where he became tutor to Empress Michiko.

In 2017, he claimed to speak 10 languages: English, French, Spanish, Italian, Portuguese, German, Swedish, Danish, Norwegian, Finnish and Japanese.

He is currently Chairman of Richard Lewis Communications Ltd.

== The Lewis Model ==
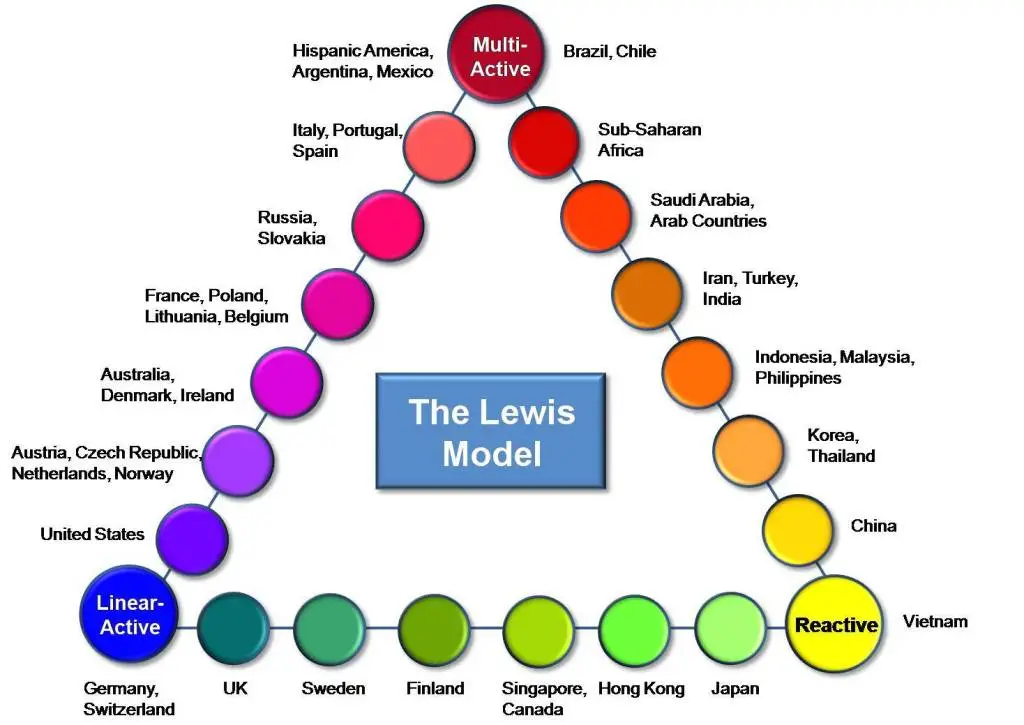
Lewis Model of Cross-Cultural Communication

The Lewis Model of Cross-Cultural Communication was developed by Richard D. Lewis. The core of the model classifies cultural norms into:

- Linear-Active
- Multi-Active
- Re-Active

or some gradient combinations.

Broadly speaking, Northern Europe, North America and related countries are predominantly Linear-Active, following tasks sequentially using Platonic, Cartesian logic. Southern European, Latin, African and Middle-Eastern countries are typified as Multi-Active, centred on relationships and often pursuing multiple goals simultaneously. East Asia is typically Re-Active, following harmonising, solidarity-based strategies.

While Lewis' writings recognise these can only be stereotypes, he asserts that his model provides a practical framework for understanding and communicating with people of other cultures, and that the model can readily be expanded with other features, such as Hofstede's cultural dimensions, seen in relation to Lewis' triangular representation.

== Media ==
In 2015 Lewis won the SIETAR Founders Award. This award, with its citation "Making a World of Difference", is granted to an individual who has demonstrated outstanding commitment and service to the intercultural field.

Fish Can't See Water by Richard D. Lewis and Kai Hammerich won the Management Book of the Year award in Denmark in 2013.

Lewis publishes articles in Business Insider. His articles focus mainly on tips and background information for doing successful business with different cultures of the world.

== Publications ==
- "Fish Can't See Water: How National Culture Can Make or Break Your Corporate Strategy" (2013), ISBN 978-1-118-60856-2, published by John Wiley & Sons
- “When Teams Collide: Managing the International Team Successfully” (2012), ISBN 978-1-904838-35-7, published by Nicholas Brealey International
- “When Cultures Collide: Leading across Cultures” (2018, 2006, 1999, 1996), ISBN 978-1-473684-82-9, published by Nicholas Brealey International
- “Cross Cultural Communication: A Visual Approach” (2008, 1999), ISBN 978-0-9534398-3-6, published by Transcreen Publications
- “The Cultural Imperative: Global Trends in the 21st Century” (2007, 2003), ISBN 978-1-931930-35-2, published by Intercultural Press
- “Humour across Frontiers” (2005), ISBN 978-0-9534398-2-9, published by Transcreen Publications
- “Finland, Cultural Lone Wolf” (2005), ISBN 978-1-931930-49-9, published by Intercultural Press
- “The Billingers” (2009, 1985, 1976), ISBN 978-0-9534398-4-3, published by Transcreen Publications
- “The Road from Wigan Pier: Memoirs of a Linguist” (1998, autobiography), ISBN 978-0-9534398-0-5, published by Transcreen Publications
