= Stephan Dahl =

British academic

- Born: 29 September 1971 (age 55); Wuppertal, Germany
- Scientific career
- Fields: Social media, Social marketing
- Workplaces: New University of Lisbon; University of Hull; James Cook University
- Website: stephan.dahl.at twitter.com/stephx

Stephan Dahl FRSA (born 29 September 1971) is a British academic who holds the position of Cátedra Santander at the New University of Lisbon, Faculty of Social and Human Sciences and adjunct associate professor at James Cook University. Previously, he was senior lecturer at the University of Hull having previously taught marketing at Middlesex University in London, United Kingdom. He is an advocate of diversity marketing.

== Early life ==
Dahl grew up and was educated in Wuppertal, Germany before attending Cass Business School in London. He worked for a German music station and MTV and moved to Spain to complete his post-graduate studies before becoming an academic specialising in marketing communications, especially health promotion, social marketing and cross-cultural communication.

== Career ==
In his early career, Dahl focused on cross cultural communication, authoring various books and academic articles regarding the impact of culture on marketing and business, such as Intercultural Skills for Business and Culture and Transformation. Stephan Dahl was also a member of the Board of SIETAR UK. In June 2006, Dr Dahl was ranked as the 3rd Top author in Europe on the Social Science Research Network, and 33rd worldwide. Recently he focuses increasingly on social media, social marketing and ethical aspects of marketing. He has spoken at several international conferences, including giving keynote addresses at the European Social Marketing Conference and Culture of Business conferences. Dahl has been an invited speaker at many universities, including Universidad de los Andes and Chinese University of Hong Kong, and his research on the ethical implications of hybrid media featured in a Channel 4 documentary on fast food marketing, and he has been widely interviewed on the topic.

== Other interests ==
Dahl is an active supporter of LGBT rights organisations, serving as a volunteer and trustee for organisations such as The Foodchain, Globe Centre and London Lesbian and Gay Switchboard. In 2015, he was named as one of Pride London's PrideHeros.

== Bibliography ==
- Dahl, Stephan: Culture and Culture Transformation, ECE, 1997
- Dahl, Stephan: Intercultural Skills for Business, ECE, 2000
- Dahl, Stephan: Diversity Marketing, Thomson, 2002
- Eagle, Lynne; Dahl, Stephan; Hill, Susie etc. al Social Marketing, Pearson, 2013,
- Eagle, Lynne; Dahl, Stephan; etc. al Marketing Communications, Routledge, 2014,
- Dahl, Stephan: Social Media Marketing, Sage, 2014,
- Eagle, Lynne; Dahl, Stephan: Marketing Ethics & Society, Sage, 2015
- Dahl, Stephan: Social Media Marketing, 2nd Edition, Sage, 2018,
