= Juliane House =

German linguist and translation studies scholar

- Born: 1942 (age 83–84)
- Occupations: Linguist, translation scholar

Academic background
- Education: University of Heidelberg; University of Toronto (PhD)

Academic work
- Discipline: Translation studies
- Institutions: Hellenic American University; University of Hamburg

Juliane House (born 1942) is a German linguist and translation studies scholar. Her research interests include translation theory and practice, contrastive pragmatics, discourse analysis, politeness theory, English as lingua franca, intercultural communication, and global business communication.

== Biography ==
House received a degree in English and Spanish Translation and International Law from the University of Heidelberg, Germany. Later, she worked as a translator and researcher. She earned her BEd, MA and PhD in Linguistics and Applied Linguistics (1976) at the University of Toronto, Canada.

She is a senior member of the German Science Foundation’s Research Centre on Multilingualism at the University of Hamburg, where she held a position from 1979 until her retirement in 2008. While there she directed several projects on translation and interpreting.

She was one of the founding members of IATIS and one of its former presidents.

Since 2008, she has been the Chair of Linguistics Programs and Director of the PhD in Applied Linguistics: Discourse in English Language Teaching, Testing or Translation/Interpreting Program at Hellenic American University.

== Awards and honors ==
In 2024, House was elected a fellow of Academia Europaea.

== Selected publications ==
Monographs

- House, J. (1977), A Model for Translation Quality Assessment (PhD thesis)
- Edmondson, W.J. & House, J. (1981). Let's Talk and Talk About It: A Pedagogic Interactional Grammar of English. Urban und Schwarzenberg
- House, J. (2015). Translation quality assessment: Past and present. Routledge.
- House, J. (2016). Translation as communication across languages and cultures. Routledge, Taylor & Francis Group.
- House, J. (2018). Translation: The basics (First edition). Routledge/Taylor & Francis Group.
- House, J. & Dániel Z. Kádár (2021). Cross-cultural Pragmatics. Cambridge University Press.
- Edmondson, W.J. House, J. & Dániel Z. Kádár (2023). Expressions, speech acts and discourse - A pedagogical interactional grammar of English. Cambridge University Press.
- Almanna, A. & House, J. (2024). Linguistics for translators. Routledge.
- House, J. & Dániel Z. Kádár (2024). Cross-cultural Pragmatics and Foreign Language Learning. Edinburgh University Press.

Edited volumes

- House, J. & Blum-Kulka, S. (1986). Interlingual and Intercultural Communication. Narr.
- Blum-Kulka, S., House, J. & Kasper, G. (1989). Cross-Cultural Pragmatics: requests and apologies. Praeger.
- House, J., Kapser, G. & Ross, S. (2003). Misunderstanding in Social Life. Discourse Approaches to Problematic Talk. Routledge.

== Bibliography ==
- Probst, J.: Ein Kompliment in Ehren … Aspekte eines "höflichen" Sprechaktes in mehreren Sprachen, in: Übersetzen, Interkulturelle Kommunikation, Spracherwerb und Sprachvermittlung - das Leben mit mehreren Sprachen. Festschrift für Juliane House zum 60. Geburtstag, Zeitschrift für Interkulturellen Fremdsprachenunterricht, 2003
