= International Association for Translation and Intercultural Studies =

The International Association for Translation and Intercultural Studies (IATIS) is a forum designed to enable scholars from different regional and disciplinary backgrounds to debate issues relating to translation and other forms of intercultural communication.

Founded in August 2004, its President is Juliane House. Mona Baker, Şebnem Susam-Sarajeva and other linguists are also members of its Executive Council. Its secretariat is located in Seoul, South Korea.

== See also ==
- Area studies
- Cross-cultural studies
- Cultural competence
- Cultural sensitivity
- Cultural studies
- Intercultural communication principles
- Intercultural relations
- Interculturality
- Project Lingua
- Translation
