= Laura Soames =

British phonetician (1840–1895)

Laura Soames (Brighton, 1840–1895) was a British phonetician, best known for her work applying phonetic principles to the teaching of the pronunciation of English and of foreign languages. An important contribution of her work was to popularize phonetics among language teachers.

== Career ==
Soames was a language teacher whose interest in phonetics was linked to her interest in spelling reform and the teaching of reading. She was an active member of the Phonetic Teachers' Association, which evolved into the International Phonetic Association (IPA). In 1890 she was elected to the council of the IPA. She was highly regarded by its founder Passy and other phoneticians in Europe, including Wilhelm Viëtor (1850–1918), founder of the journal Phonetische Studien. Viëtor revised Soames' influential Introduction to Phonetics (English, French and German) (Soames 1891) and published it under the title, Introduction to English, French and German Phonetics (Soames, Viëtor 1899, still in print). Later he edited and added to a manuscript she was working on at the time of her death which combined revisions of the Introduction with aspects of The Child’s Key to Reading (Soames 1894), the book which had established her as a force in language education. This edited work was published as The Teacher’s Manual (Soames, n.d., Viëtor 1897).

Soames is also known for her 1889 proposal, which she credited to Curwen, that principal accents (stresses) are isochronous in English, that is, they appear at equal time intervals. The well-known phonetician Henry Sweet quickly disagreed, and the argument continues to the present day.

== Legacy ==
Soames left a bequest to the University of London to fund the Laura Soames Prize, which was intended to promote the study of phonetics by awarding an annual prize in the Department of Phonetics at University College for the most distinguished piece of research work dealing with the phonetic structure of a living language.

== Selected publications ==
- Soames, L. (1889). "ɔn iŋgliʃ stres" [On English stress]. Le maître phonétique. 4 (3): 34–35. JSTOR 44707436.
- Soames, L. 1891. An introduction to phonetics. London: Swan Sonnenschein. ISBN 978-1331984221
- Soames, L. (n.d.). The Teacher's Manual: Pt. 1 The sounds of English. London: Swan Sonnenschein.
- Viëtor, Wilhelm, editor. 1897. The Teacher's Manual: Pt. 2. London: Swan Sonnenschein.
