= Mona Baker =

Professor of translation studies

- منى بيكر
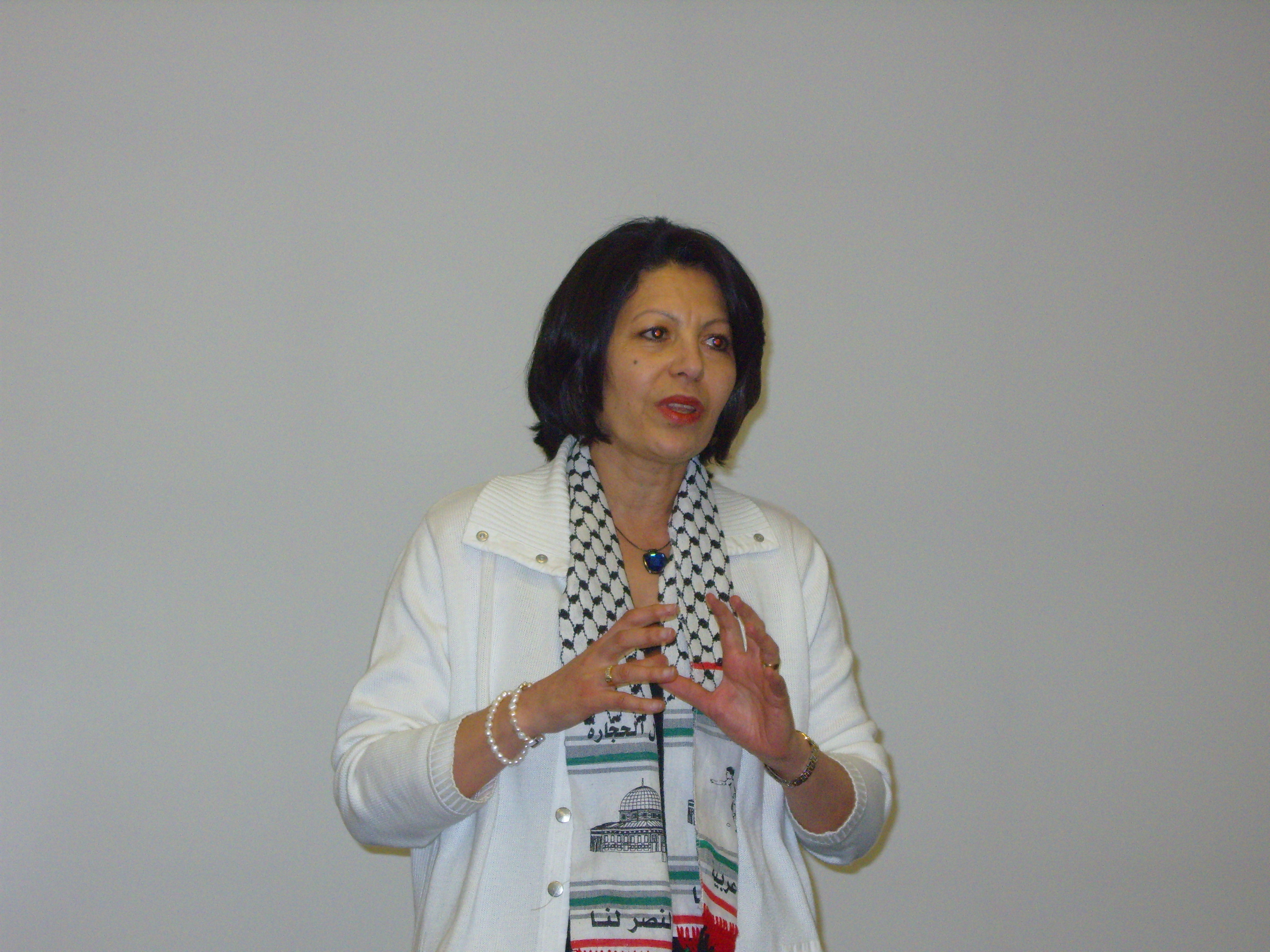
- Born: 29 September 1953 (age 73)

Academic background
- Education: American University in Cairo, University of Birmingham, University of Manchester Institute of Science and Technology

Academic work
- Discipline: Translation Studies
- Institutions: The University of Manchester
- Website: monabaker.org

Mona Baker (née Mona El Hilali; Arabic: منى الهلالي; born 29 September 1953) is former professor of Translation Studies and founder of the Centre for Translation and Intercultural Studies of the University of Manchester in England.

== Career ==
Baker studied at the American University in Cairo, where she gained a BA in English and Comparative Literature. Afterwards she studied applied linguistics at the University of Birmingham, obtaining an MA in 1987. In 1995 she moved to the University of Manchester Institute of Science and Technology where she became a professor in 2001. She is currently Affiliate Professor of the Sustainable Health Unit at the University of Oslo, Norway, and Honorary Dean of the Graduate School of Translation and Interpretation at Beijing Foreign Studies University.

She is the founder of St. Jerome Publishing where she was editorial director until 2014 when Routledge bought the St. Jerome catalogue. She also founded the international journal The Translator.

Since 2009 she has been an honorary member of IAPTI. In the framework of this association she delivered a speech on "Ethics in the Translation/Interpreting Curriculum" She is also a founding member and former co-Vice-president of the International Association of Translation and Intercultural Studies.

As a researcher, she is interested in translation and conflict, the role of ethics in research and training in Translation Studies, the application of narrative theory to translation and interpretation, activist communities in translation and corpus-based translation studies; she has published extensively in these areas. She has also edited reference works. In her most recent book, Rethinking Evidence in the Time of Pandemics (Cambridge University Press, 2022; co-authored with Eivind Engebretsen), she demonstrates how effective story-telling can enhance the reception of medical knowledge and reduce some of the sources of resistance and misunderstanding that plague public communication about the COVID-19 pandemic and other medical emergencies.

== Middle East conflict and Israeli academics ==
She received much criticism and created great controversy in 2002, when she removed two Israeli academics, Dr. Miriam Shlesinger of Bar-Ilan University and Professor Gideon Toury of Tel Aviv University, Israel, from the editorial boards of her journals Translator and Translation Studies Abstracts, based on their affiliation to Israeli institutions.

Baker stated that the interpretation of the boycott was her own and she did not necessarily expect other signatories in a similar position to adopt the same course of action. Baker, of Egyptian origin, said she was bemused by the row over two "tiny" journals. A spokeswoman for the university stated that: "This is nothing to do with UMIST. The boycott documentation clearly states Mona Baker signs it as an individual."

Subsequently, Baker announced that The Translator will no longer publish any research by scholars affiliated with Israeli institutions and will refuse to sell books and journals to Israeli libraries.

=== Response from Professors ===
In an email sent to Professor Toury on 8 June 2002, Baker asked him to resign and warned him that she would "unappoint you" if he refused. Baker justified her action by stating that "I do not wish to continue an official association with any Israeli under the present circumstances", although she also stated that her decision was "political, not personal" and that she still regarded Professor Toury and Professor Shlesinger as friends.

Professor Toury subsequently responded that "I would appreciate it if the announcement made it clear that 'he' (that is, I) was appointed as a scholar and unappointed as an Israeli." Toury also stated that "I am certainly worried, not because of the boycott itself but because it may get bigger and bigger so that people will not be invited to conferences or lectures, or periodicals will be judged not on merit, but the identity of the place where the author lives."

Dr Shlesinger responded that: "I don't think [Israeli prime minister] Ariel Sharon is going to withdraw from the West Bank because Israeli academics are being boycotted. The idea is to boycott me as an Israeli, but I don't think it achieves anything."

=== Criticism ===
Baker's actions were sharply criticised by Professor Stephen Greenblatt of Harvard University and the president of the Modern Language Association of America, who called the firings "repellent", "dangerous" and "morally bankrupt". Greenblatt described Baker's actions as an "attack on cultural cooperation" which "violates the essential spirit of scholarly freedom and the pursuit of truth". British Prime Minister Tony Blair also criticised Baker's actions, and stated that he will "do anything necessary" to stop the academic boycott of Israeli scholars.

In the British House of Commons, an Early Day Motion (EDM 1590) condemning Baker's actions was passed, stating that Parliament "deplores discrimination against academics of any nationality, as being inconsistent with the principle of academic freedom, regards such discrimination as downright anti-semitic while pretending simply to be opposed to Israeli government policy... and calls upon UMIST to apologise for this disgusting act and to dismiss Professor Baker."

Judith Butler suggested that Baker had "engaged established anti-semitic stereotypes", though this "does not mean that she is anti-Semitic." According to Butler, to claim "that all Jews hold a given view on Israel or are adequately represented by Israel … is to conflate Jews with Israel and, thereby, to commit an anti-semitic reduction of Jewishness." Baker responded to Butler at length in the London Review of Books. An unedited version of the letter, which circulated widely at the time, is available on Mona Baker's website.

The National Union of Students (NUS), in addition to condemning academic boycotts as a whole, specifically condemning Baker's sackings of the two Israeli professors as "racist." Mandy Telford, president of the NUS, stated that "The National Union of Students stands firmly against all forms of discrimination. This is an abuse of academic freedom that can only have a negative impact on students at Umist...We wouldn't support the infringement of [people] being able to study because of where they live and where they are." Daniel Rose, the NUS's anti-racism campaign convenor, said: "To exclude people based on their nationality is abhorrent and nothing short of racism, and should be universally condemned."

In 2002 the European Society for Translation Studies condemned the ousting of Toury and Shlesinger, both members of the Society, arguing that "in their intellectual work they are not representatives of their country but individuals who are known for their research, their desire to develop translation studies and to promote translation and intercultural dialogue."

=== Support ===
Baker received support from a number of sources, including Jews for Justice for Palestinians, the Manchester Palestine Solidarity Campaign, the Muslim Association of Britain, and many members of the public who expressed their support through letters and emails.

=== Baker's response ===
Baker wrote a detailed response to her critics (a brief summary of which was published in the London Review of Books). Baker wrote that "the Jewish press in Britain is shamelessly and exclusively pro-Israel" and cited support for her position from Israeli Professor Ilan Pappe. She also cited a letter to the editor supporting her from Seymour Alexander, who identified himself as a British Jew, and Lawrence Davidson, an American Jew who co-authored "In Defence of the Academic Boycott" with her. She also criticised "the intense and highly distorting smear campaign led mostly by the Jewish press in the UK against me."

In an interview with Al-Ahram, Baker stated that "Anybody who thinks they are going to make any change in vicious, horrific policies like those of Israel and the US without affecting individuals is simply being naïve." Baker also stated that her decision to fire the two Israelis was "intended as a minor symbolic gesture but simply because of the arrogance of the Zionist lobby it's out of the bag now. And it's doing some good, I believe, in that it's forcing people to really confront the issues."

In an interview with The Daily Telegraph, Baker stated that she was the victim of "a large intimidation machine out there" that attempts to silence criticism of Israel and that "the Americans are the worst offenders". When asked about the dismissals, she responded to her critics by stating, "I'm damned if I'm going to be intimidated. This is my interpretation of the boycott statement that I've signed and I've tried to make that clear but it doesn't seem to be getting through. I am not actually boycotting Israelis, I am boycotting Israeli institutions". In the same interview, Baker sharply criticised Israeli policies, stating that: "Israel has gone beyond just war crimes. It is horrific what is going on there. Many of us would like to talk about it as some kind of Holocaust which the world will eventually wake up to, much too late, of course, as they did with the last one."

At a conference held in London in 2004 to discuss the implementation of a boycott of Israeli academic institutions, Baker stated that a boycott of Israel must avoid the appearance of discrimination and the risk of dilution due to individually chosen exceptions, and proposed that the academic boycott be cast as an economic boycott, which implies that all academics at Israeli institutions should be boycotted "to undermine the institutions that allow a pariah state to function and claim membership of the international community." In support of boycott, Baker stated "supporters of an economic boycott [against Tourism to Israel] do not ask whether the individual hotel workers who are being laid off in Israel are individually for or against the occupation."

== Selected works ==
- Baker, Mona, ed. (2009). Translation Studies. Vol. I, II, III. Routledge. p. 1608. ISBN 9780415344227. Archived from the original on 8 December 2021.
- Baker, Mona, ed. (2010). Translation Studies. Routledge. p. 1608. ISBN 9780415595742. Archived from the original on 30 August 2023.
- Baker, Mona; Saldanha, Gabriela, eds. (2011). Routledge Encyclopedia of Translation Studies. Routledge. p. 680. ISBN 9780415609845. Archived from the original on 19 September 2021.
- Baker, Mona (2019) [2018]. Translation and Conflict: A narrative account (2nd ed.). Routledge. p. 226. ISBN 9781138600447.
- Baker, Mona (2018) [2018]. In Other Words: A Coursebook on Translation (3rd ed.). Routledge. p. 390. ISBN 9781138666887.
- Baker, Mona (2020) [2019]. Kim, Kyung Hye; Zhu, Yifan (eds.). Researching Translation in the Age of Technology and Global Conflict: Selected Works of Mona Baker (2d ed.). Routledge. p. 352. ISBN 9780367109967.
