= Isochrony =

Rhythmic division of time in spoken language

Isochrony is a linguistic analysis or hypothesis assuming that any spoken language's utterances are divisible into equal rhythmic portions of some kind. Under this assumption, languages are proposed to broadly fall into one of two categories based on rhythm or timing: syllable-timed or stress-timed languages (or, in some analyses, a third category: mora-timed languages). In syllable-timing, every syllable takes up roughly equal time, while in stress-timing, there is roughly equal time between every stressed syllable.

While isochrony may be a useful theoretical framework in some contexts, studies suggest that, at best, syllable structure in natural speech has only a somewhat regular rhythm and perfectly regular speech may in fact be less intelligible. Careful linguistic analysis instead reveals that isochrony may be a subjective feature of language: more a listener perception than an inherent part of a language, making it a difficult hypothesis to test. Empirical studies have been mixed: unable to directly or fully support the hypothesis but sometimes lending support to it as a general or average tendency of languages; therefore, the concept remains controversial in linguistics. According to British phonetician Peter Roach:

there is no language which is totally syllable-timed or totally stress-timed—all languages display both sorts of timing; languages will, however, differ in which type of timing predominates. Secondly, different types of timing will be exhibited by the same speaker on different occasions and in different contexts.

== History ==
Rhythm is an aspect of prosody, other (related) aspects being intonation, stress, and tempo of speech. Isochrony refers to rhythmic division of time into equal portions by a language. The idea was first expressed thus by Kenneth L. Pike in 1945, though the concept of language naturally occurring in chronologically and rhythmically equal measures is found at least as early as 1775 (in Prosodia Rationalis). Soames (1889) attributed the idea to Curwen. This has implications for linguistic typology: D. Abercrombie claimed "As far as is known, every language in the world is spoken with one kind of rhythm or with the other ... French, Telugu and Yoruba ... are syllable-timed languages ... English, Russian and Arabic ... are stress-timed languages."

While many linguists find the idea of different rhythm types appealing, empirical studies have not been able to find acoustic correlates of the postulated types, calling into question the validity of these types. However, when viewed as a matter of degree, relative differences in the variability of syllable duration across languages have been found.

== Alternative division of time ==
Three alternative ways in which a language can divide time are postulated:

1. The duration of every syllable is equal (syllable-timed);
2. The duration of every mora is equal (mora-timed).
3. The interval between two stressed syllables is equal (stress-timed).

=== Syllable timing ===
In a syllable-timed language, every syllable is perceived as taking up roughly the same amount of time, though the absolute length of time depends on the prosody. Syllable-timed languages tend to give syllables approximately equal prominence and generally lack reduced vowels.

French, Italian, Spanish, Romanian, Brazilian Portuguese, Icelandic, Singlish, Cantonese, Mandarin Chinese, Armenian, Turkish, Korean and many Indian languages (such as Hindi, Urdu, Punjabi, Tamil, Odia, Bengali, etc.; to name a few) are commonly quoted as examples of syllable-timed languages. This type of rhythm was originally metaphorically referred to as "machine-gun rhythm" because each underlying rhythmical unit is of the same duration, similar to the transient bullet noise of a machine gun.

Since the 1950s, speech scientists have tried to show the existence of equal syllable durations in the acoustic speech signal without success. More recent research claims that the duration of consonantal and vocalic intervals is responsible for syllable-timed perception.

=== Mora timing ===
Some languages like Japanese, Gilbertese, Slovak and Ganda also have regular pacing but are mora-timed, rather than syllable-timed. In Japanese, a V or CV syllable takes up one timing unit. Japanese does not have diphthongs but double vowels, so CVV takes roughly twice the time as CV. A final /N/ also takes roughly as much time as a CV syllable, as does the extra length of a geminate consonant.

Ancient Greek and Vedic Sanskrit were also strictly mora-timed. Classical Persian was also mora-timed, though most modern dialects are not. Mora-timing is still common when reciting classical Persian poetry and music.

=== Stress timing ===
An American English speaker narrating this section. Listen for his stress timing.

In a stress-timed language, syllables may last different amounts of time, but there is perceived to be a fairly constant amount of time, on average, between consecutive stressed syllables. Consequently, unstressed syllables between stressed syllables tend to be compressed to fit into the time interval: if two stressed syllables are separated by a single unstressed syllable, as in delicious tea, the unstressed syllable will be relatively long, while if a larger number of unstressed syllables intervenes, as in tolerable tea, the unstressed syllables will be shorter.

Stress-timing is sometimes called "Morse-code rhythm," but any resemblance between the two is only superficial. Stress-timing is strongly related to vowel reduction processes. English, Thai, (non-Swiss) German, Russian, Danish, Swedish, Catalan, Norwegian, Faroese, Dutch, European Portuguese, and (Iranian) Persian are typical stress-timed languages. Some stress-timed languages, for example Arabic, retain unreduced vowels.

== Degrees of durational variability ==
Despite the relative simplicity of the classifications above, in the real world languages do not fit quite so easily into such precise categories. Languages exhibit degrees of durational variability both in relation to other languages and to other standards of the same language.

There can be varying degrees of stress-timing within the various standards of a language. Some southern dialects of Italian, a syllable-timed language, are effectively stress-timed. English, a stress-timed language, has become so widespread that some standards tend to be more syllable-timed than the British or North American standards, an effect which comes from the influence of other languages spoken in the relevant region. Indian English, for example, tends toward syllable-timing. This does not necessarily mean the language standard itself is to be classified as syllable-timed, of course, but rather that this feature is more pronounced. A subtle example is that to a native English speaker, for example, some accents from Wales may sound more syllable-timed.

A better-documented case of these varying degrees of stress-timing in a language comes from Portuguese. European Portuguese is more stress-timed than the Brazilian standard. The latter has mixed characteristics and varies according to speech rate, gender and dialect. At fast speech rates, Brazilian Portuguese is more stress-timed, while in slow speech rates, it can be more syllable-timed. The accents of rural, southern Rio Grande do Sul and the Northeast (especially Bahia) are considered to sound more syllable-timed than the others, while the southeastern dialects such as the mineiro, in central Minas Gerais, the paulistano, of the northern coast and eastern regions of São Paulo, and the fluminense, along Rio de Janeiro, Espírito Santo and eastern Minas Gerais as well the Federal District, are most frequently essentially stress-timed. Also, male speakers of Brazilian Portuguese speak faster than female speakers and speak in a more stress-timed manner.

Linguist Peter Ladefoged has proposed (citing work by Grabe and Low) that, since languages differ from each other in terms of the amount of difference between the durations of vowels in adjacent syllables, it is possible to calculate a Pairwise Variability Index (PVI) from measured vowel durations to quantify the differences. The data show that, for example, Dutch (traditionally classed as a stress-timed language) exhibits a higher PVI than Spanish (traditionally a syllable-timed language).

== The stress-timing–syllable-timing distinction as a continuum ==
Given the lack of solid evidence for a clear-cut categorical distinction between the two rhythmical types, it seems reasonable to suggest instead that all languages (and all their accents) display both types of rhythm to a greater or lesser extent. T. F. Mitchell claimed that there is no language which is totally syllable-timed or totally stress-timed; rather, all languages display both sorts of timing. Languages will, however, differ in which type of timing predominates. This view was developed by Dauer in such a way that a metric was provided allowing researchers to place any language on a scale from maximally stress-timed to maximally syllable-timed. Examples of this approach in use are Dimitrova's study of Bulgarian and Olivo's study of the rhythm of Ashanti Twi.

According to Dafydd Gibbon and Briony Williams, Welsh is neither syllable-timed nor stress-timed, as syllable length varies less than in stress-timed languages.

== See also ==
- Stress and vowel reduction in English
