= Cross-cultural communication =

Study of how people from differing cultures communicate

Cross-cultural communication is a field of study investigating how people from differing cultural backgrounds communicate, in similar and different ways among themselves, and how they endeavor to communicate across cultures. Intercultural communication is a related field of study.

Cross-cultural communication can be understood as the interaction between people from different cultural backgrounds who have different values, languages, beliefs, and communication styles. These differences can affect how messages are sent, understood, and interpreted in social or professional situations. Since technology and globalization continue to connect people from different countries, communication between cultures has become more common, but also more complex. Researchers and scholars in the field have discovered that differences in cultural norms and communication styles can lead to misunderstandings when individuals are not aware of those differences. Researchers and scholars like Geert Hofstede and Edward T. Hall have studied these cultural differences and explained how communication is different among cultures. Because of this, cross-cultural communication has become an important area of study to help understand how people can communicate better across other cultures.

Cross-cultural communication deals with the comparison of different cultures. In cross-cultural communication, differences are understood and acknowledged, and can bring about individual change, but not collective transformations. In cross-cultural societies, one culture is often considered "the norm" and all other cultures are compared or contrasted to the dominant culture.

== Origins and culture ==
During the Cold War, the economy of the United States was largely self-contained because the world was polarized into two separate and competing powers: the East and the West. However, changes and advancements in economic relationships, political systems, and technological options began to break down old cultural barriers. Business transformed from individual-country capitalism to global capitalism. Thus, the study of cross-cultural communication was originally found within businesses and government, both seeking to expand globally. Businesses began to offer language training to their employees and programs were developed to train employees to understand how to act when abroad. With this also came the development of the Foreign Service Institute, or FSI, through the Foreign Service Act of 1946, where government employees received training and prepared for overseas posts. There began also implementation of a "world view" perspective in the curriculum of higher education. In 1974, the International Progress Organization, with the support of UNESCO and under the auspices of Senegalese President Léopold Sédar Senghor, held an international conference on "The Cultural Self-comprehension of Nations" (Innsbruck, Austria, 27–29 July 1974) which called upon United Nations member states "to organize systematic and global comparative research on the different cultures of the world" and "to make all possible efforts for a more intensive training of diplomats in the field of international cultural co-operation ... and to develop the cultural aspects of their foreign policy."

There has been increasing pressure for universities across the world to incorporate intercultural and international understanding and knowledge into the education of their students. International literacy and cross-cultural understanding have become critical to a country's cultural, technological, economic, and political health. It has become essential for universities to educate, or more importantly, "transform", to function effectively and comfortably in a world characterized by close, multi-faceted relationships and permeable borders. Students must possess a certain level of global competence to understand the world they live in and how they fit into this world. This level of global competence starts at ground level- the university and its faculty- with how they generate and transmit cross-cultural knowledge and information to students.

== Interdisciplinary orientation ==
Cross-cultural communication endeavors to bring together the relatively unrelated fields of cultural anthropology with established areas of communication. At its core, cross-cultural communication involves understanding the ways in which culturally distinct individuals communicate with each other. Its charge is to also produce some guidelines with which people from different cultures can better communicate with each other.

Cross-cultural communication requires an interdisciplinary approach. It involves literacy in fields such as anthropology, cultural studies, psychology and communication. The field has also moved both toward the treatment of interethnic relations, and toward the study of communication strategies used by co-cultural populations, i.e., communication strategies used to deal with majority or mainstream populations.

Language socialization can be broadly defined as "an investigation of how language both presupposes and creates anew, social relations in cultural context". It is imperative that the speaker understands the grammar and prosody of a language, as well as how elements of language are socially situated in order to reach communicative competence. Human experience is culturally relevant, so elements of language are also culturally relevant. One must carefully consider semiotics and the evaluation of sign systems to compare cross-cultural norms of communication. There are several potential problems that come with language socialization, however. Sometimes people can overgeneralize or label cultures with stereotypical and subjective characterizations. Another primary concern with documenting alternative cultural norms revolves around the fact that no social actor uses language in ways that perfectly match normative characterizations. A methodology for investigating how an individual uses language and other semiotic activity to create and use new models of conduct and how this varies from the cultural norm should be incorporated into the study of language socialization.

== Global rise ==
With increasing globalization and international trade, it is unavoidable that different cultures will meet, conflict, and blend together. People from different cultures find it difficult to communicate not only due to language barriers, but also are affected by cultural styles. For instance, in individualistic cultures, such as in the United States, Canada, and Western Europe, an independent figure or self is dominant. This independent figure is characterized by a sense of self relatively distinct from others and the environment. In interdependent cultures, usually identified as Asian, Latin American, African, and Southern European cultures, an interdependent figure of self is dominant. There is a much greater emphasis on the interrelatedness of the individual to others and the environment; the self is meaningful only (or primarily) in the context of social relationships, duties, and roles. To some degree, the effect brought by cultural differences overrides the language gap. This cultural style difference contributes to one of the biggest challenges for cross-cultural communication. Effective communication with people of different cultures is especially challenging. Cultures provide people with ways of thinking—ways of seeing, hearing, and interpreting the world. Thus the same words can mean different things to people from different cultures, even when they speak the "same" language. When the languages are different, and translation has to be used to communicate, the potential for misunderstandings increases. The study of cross-cultural communication is a global research area. As a result, cultural differences in the study of cross-cultural communication can already be found. For example, cross-cultural communication is generally considered part of communication studies in the US, but is emerging as a sub-field of applied linguistics in the UK.

== Cross-cultural communication in the workplace ==
Corporations have grown into new countries, regions, and continents around the world, which has caused people of various cultures to move and learn to adapt to their environment. This has led to cross-cultural communication becoming more important in the work environment. From nonverbal to spoken communication, it is critical for a company or organization's performance. The entire company or organization will face drastic hardships when their communication is restricted. Over the past few decades, many Western corporations have expanded into Sub-Saharan Africa. James Baba Abugre conducted a study on Western expatriates who have moved to work in Ghana. Abugre interviewed both the expatriates and Ghanaians, and found that cultural competence is essential to working with others of different cultures in order to avoid conflict between Western and Eastern cultural norms. It is important that workers understand both verbal and non-verbal communication styles. Expatriates who move to work in a culture that is not their own should be prepared, be properly trained, and have access to educational resources to help them succeed and to appreciate the culture they have moved into, in order to navigate it effectively. Abugre's main finding is that cultural competency is important to cross-cultural communication. Paula Caligiuri has proposed training of international workers in cultural agility techniques as a way to improve such communication.

In many workplaces, cross-cultural communication skills are developed through training programs that help people practice communicating with others from a different cultural background. An example of this is a study by Rosen et al., where participants practiced communication through simulated interactions with people from other cultures. In the study participants worked with trained people pretending to be patients from different cultural backgrounds, which helped them practice real communication encounters in a controlled place. This helped them learn how to adjust their communication based on the different cultural expectations and behaviors. This study found that many of them felt confident and more prepared to communicate with people from different cultural backgrounds after this activity. Research indicates that practicing real-life scenarios can improve cross-cultural communication skills and bring awareness to cultural differences in a professional setting. The training helps people improve how they respond and communicate with people from other cultural backgrounds, which helps them adjust their communication style depending on the culture. Having practice and receiving feedback can help reduce misunderstandings and strengthen communication in their settings.

Cross-cultural communication skills are also important in global workplaces where people interact with others from different countries and cultures. In international businesses communication can affect teamwork, decision-making, and customer service. Companies that work across multiple regions rely on strong communication skills to work with people from different backgrounds. Research shows that cross-cultural communication skills can improve teamwork and the performance of the workplace. Differences in communication styles can also affect how people share ideas and work together in professional settings, and this can have an impact on how successful a workplace is when working with different cultures. Cross-cultural communication is a very important skill when working in modern workplaces.

Yaila Zotzmann, Dimitri van der Linden, and Knut Wyra looked at Asia, Europe, and North America. Together they had a focus on employees in each continent with a focus on error orientation. The authors define this as "one's attitude toward dealing with, communicating about, and learning from errors". They studied employees from China, Germany, Hungary, Japan, Malaysia, the Netherlands, the United States of America, and Vietnam. Country differences, cultural values, and personality factors were also accounted for. The study was quantitative and looked at a single organization that had offices in eight countries. Results showed error orientation varied based on the culture they were in. Americans tend to be more open to errors and learn from them as well as speaking about their mistakes, whereas Japanese subjects had the lowest tolerance for errors. The Japanese showed concern about how it may impact those around them and the organization. The study also referred to Hofstede's cultural dimensions theory. The findings show a potential relationship between error orientation and an employee's culture. Other important factors are the country they live in or personality dimensions.

Cross-cultural communications and boundaries are present in all sectors. In Europe, cross-cultural communication in primary care is important, for example in dealing with migrants in the present European migrant crisis. Maria van den Muijsenbergh conducted a study on primary care in Europe as well as a new program, RESTORE. The program stands for: "Research into implementation STrategies to support patients of different ORigins and language background in a variety of European primary care settings". The countries participating are Ireland, England, Scotland, Austria, the Netherlands, and Greece. Muijsenbergh found in her study that there was a range of issues in primary care for migrants in Europe. There are both language and culture barriers between medical professionals and patients, which has an impact on their communication. Even with the translation methods that technology provides, language barriers remain to fall fast. The study also found that migrants were more likely to use emergency services, which was consistent in countries with a steady influx of migrants or few migrants, and during times of economic prosperity or recession. Muijsenbergh found that migrants have worse health than native Europeans, with her findings suggesting that this is a result of the language and cultural barriers. She recommends medical professionals use different training and educational resources in order to become cross-cultural communicators.

== Incorporation into college programs ==
The application of cross-cultural communication theory to foreign language education is increasingly appreciated around the world. Cross-cultural communication classes can now be found within foreign language departments of some universities, while other schools are placing cross-cultural communication programs in their departments of education.

With the increasing pressures and opportunities of globalization, the incorporation of international networking alliances has become an "essential mechanism for the internationalization of higher education". Many universities from around the world have taken great strides to increase intercultural understanding through processes of organizational change and innovations. In general, university processes revolve around four major dimensions which include: organizational change, curriculum innovation, staff development, and student mobility. Ellingboe emphasizes these four major dimensions with his own specifications for the internationalization process. His specifications include: (1) college leadership; (2) faculty members' international involvement in activities with colleagues, research sites, and institutions worldwide; (3) the availability, affordability, accessibility, and transferability of study abroad programs for students; (4) the presence and integration of international students, scholars, and visiting faculty into campus life; and (5) international co-curricular units (residence halls, conference planning centers, student unions, career centers, cultural immersion and language houses, student activities, and student organizations).

Above all, universities need to make sure that they are open and responsive to changes in the outside environment. In order for internationalization to be fully effective, the university (including all staff, students, curriculum, and activities) needs to be current with cultural changes, and willing to adapt to these changes. As stated by Ellingboe, internationalization "is an ongoing, future-oriented, multidimensional, interdisciplinary, leadership-driven vision that involves many stakeholders working to change the internal dynamics of an institution to respond and adapt appropriately to an increasingly diverse, globally focused, ever-changing external environment". New distance learning technologies, such as interactive teleconferencing, enable students located thousands of miles apart to communicate and interact in a virtual classroom.

Research has indicated that certain themes and images such as children, animals, life cycles, relationships, and sports can transcend cultural differences and may be used in international settings such as traditional and online university classrooms to create common ground among diverse cultures (Van Hook, 2011).

Many Master of Science in Management programs have an internationalization specialization which may place a focus on cross-cultural communication. For example, the Ivey Business School has a course titled Cross Cultural Management.

Jadranka Zlomislić, Ljerka Rados Gverijeri, and Elvira Bugaric study intercultural competency of students. As globalization progresses the world has become more interconnected, leading to job and study opportunities abroad in different countries and cultures, where the students are surrounded by a language that is not their mother tongue. Findings suggest that the internet is helpful but not the answer; students should enroll in language and intercultural courses in order to fight stereotypes, develop intercultural competence and become better cross-cultural communicators.

Cross-cultural communication gives opportunities to share ideas, experiences, and different perspectives and perceptions by interacting with local people.

== Challenges in cross-language qualitative research ==
Cross-language research refers to research involving two or more languages. Specifically, it can refer to: 1) researchers working with participants in a language that they are not fluent in, or; 2) researchers working with participants utilizing a language that is neither of their native languages, or; 3) translation of research or findings in another language, or; 4) researchers and participants speak the same language (not English). However, the research process and findings are directed to an English-speaking audience.

Cross-language issues are of growing concern in research of all methodological forms, but they raise particular concerns for qualitative research. Qualitative researchers seek to develop a comprehensive understanding of human behavior, using inductive approaches to investigate the meanings people attribute to their behavior, actions, and interactions with others. In other words, qualitative researchers seek to gain insights into life experiences by exploring the depth, richness, and complexity inherent to human phenomena. To gather data, qualitative researchers use direct observation and immersion, interviews, open-ended surveys, focus groups, content analysis of visual and textual material, and oral histories. Qualitative research studies involving cross-language issues are particularly complex in that they require investigating meanings, interpretations, symbols, and the processes and relations of social life.

Although a range of scholars have dedicated their attention to challenges in conducting qualitative studies in cross-cultural contexts, no methodological consensus has emerged from these studies. For instance, Edwards noticed how the inconsistent or inappropriate use of translators or interpreters can threaten the trustworthiness of cross-language qualitative research and the applicability of the translated findings on participant populations. Researchers who fail to address the methodological issues translators/interpreters present in a cross-language qualitative research can decrease the trustworthiness of the data as well as compromise the overall rigor of the study Temple and Edwards also describe the important role of translation in research, pointing out that language is not just a tool or technical label for conveying concepts; Indeed, language incorporates values and beliefs and carries cultural, social, and political meanings of a particular social reality that may not have a conceptual equivalence in the language into which will be translated. In the same veing, it has also been noted that the same words can mean different things in different cultures. For instance, as Temple et al. observe, the words we choose matter. Thus, it is crucial to give attention to how researchers describe the use of translators and/or interpreters since it reflects their competence in addressing language as a methodological issue.

=== Historical discussion of cross-language issues and qualitative research ===
In 1989, Saville-Troike was one of the first to turn to apply the use of qualitative research (in the form of ethnographic investigation) to the topic of cross-cultural communication. Using this methodology, Saville-Troike demonstrated that for successful communication to take place, a person must have the appropriate linguistic knowledge, interaction skills, and cultural knowledge. In a cross-cultural context, one must be aware of differences in norms of interaction and interpretation, values and attitudes, as well as cognitive maps and schemata. Regarding cross-cultural interviews, subsequently Stanton argued in 1996 that in order to avoid misunderstandings, the interviewer should try to walk in the other person's shoes. In other words, the interviewer needed to pay attention to the point of view of the interviewee, a notion dubbed as "connected knowing," which refers to a clear and undistorted understanding of the perspective of the interviewee.

=== Relationship between cross-language issues and qualitative research ===
As one of the primary methods for collecting rich and detailed information in qualitative research, interviews conducted in cross-cultural linguistic contexts raise a number of issues. As a form of data collection, interviews provide researchers with insight into how individuals understand and narrate aspects of their lives. Challenges may arise, however, when language barriers exist between researchers and participants. In multilingual contexts, the study of language differences is an essential part of qualitative research. van Ness et al. claim that language differences may have consequences for the research process and outcome, because concepts in one language may be understood differently in another language. For these authors, language is central in all phases of qualitative research, ranging from data collection to analysis and representation of the textual data in publications.

In addition, as van Ness et al. observe, challenges of translation can be from the perspective that interpretation of meaning is the core of qualitative research. Interpretation and representation of meaning may be challenging in any communicative act; however, they are more complicated in cross-cultural contexts where interlingual translation is necessary. Interpretation and understanding of meanings are essential in qualitative research, not only for the interview phase, but also for the final phase when meaning will be represented to the audience through oral or written text. Temple and Edwards claim that without a high level of translated understanding, qualitative research cannot shed light on different perspectives, circumstances that could shut out the voices of those who could enrich and challenge our understandings.

=== Current state of affairs of cross-language studies in qualitative research ===
According to Temple et al., a growing number of researchers are conducting studies in English-language societies with people who speak little or no English. However, few of these researchers acknowledge the influence of interpreters and translators. In addition, as Temple et al. noticed, little attention is given to the involvement of interpreters in research interviews and even less attention to language difference in focus group research with people who do not speak English. An exception would be the work of Esposito. There is some work on the role of interpreters and translators in relation to best practice and models of provision, such as that of Thomson et al., However, there is a body of literature aimed at English-speaking health and social welfare professionals on how to work with interpreters.

Temple and Edwards point out the absence of technically focused literature on translation. This is problematic because there is strong evidence that communication across languages involves more than just a literal transfer of information. In this regard, Simon claims that the translator is not someone who simply offers words in a one-to-one exchange. Rather, the translator is someone who negotiates meanings in relation to a specific context. These meanings cannot be found within the language of translation, but they are embedded in the negotiation process, which is part of their continual reactivation. For this reason, the translator needs to make continuous decisions about the cultural meanings language conveys. Thus, the process of meaning transfer has more to do with reconstructing the value of a term, rather than its cultural inscription.

=== Significant contributions to cross-language studies in qualitative research ===
Jacques Derrida is widely acknowledged to be one of the most significant contributors to the issue of language in qualitative social research. The challenges that arise in studies involving people who speak multiple languages have also been acknowledged.

Today, the main contributions concerning issues of translation and interpretation come from the field of health care, including from transcultural nursing. In a globalized era, setting the criteria for qualitative research that is linguistically and culturally representative of study participants is crucial for improving the quality of care provided by health care professionals. Scholars in the health field, like Squires, provide useful guidelines for systematically evaluating the methodological issues in cross-language research in order to address language barriers between researchers and participants.

=== Cross-language concerns in qualitative research ===
Squires defines cross-language as the process that occurs when a language barrier is present between the researcher and participants. This barrier is frequently mediated using a translator or interpreter. When the research involves two languages, interpretation issues might result in loss of meaning and thus loss of the validity of the qualitative study. As Oxley et al. point out, in a multilingual setting interpretation challenges arise when researcher and participants speak the same non-English native language, but the results of the study are intended for an English-speaking audience. For instance, when interviews, observation, and other methods of gathering data are used in cross-cultural environments, the data collection and analysis processes become more complicated due to the inseparability of the human experience and the language spoken in a culture Oxley et al. (2017). Therefore, it is crucial for researchers to be clear on what they know and believe. In other words, they should clarify their position in the research process.

In this context, positionality refers to the ethical and relational issues the researchers face when choosing a language over another to communicate their findings. For example, in his study on Chinese international students in a Canadian university, Li considers the ethical and relational issues of language choice experienced when working with the Chinese and English language. In this case, it is important that the researcher offers a rationale behind his/her language choice. Thus, as Squires observes, language plays a significant role in cross-cultural studies; it helps participants represent their sense of self.

Similarly, qualitative research interviews involve a continuous reflection on language choices because they may impact the research process and outcome. In his work, Lee illustrates the central role that reflexivity plays in setting researchers' priorities and his/her involvement in the translation process. Specifically, his study focuses on the dilemma that researchers speaking the same language as participants face when the findings are intended for an English-speaking audience only. Lee introduces the article by arguing that "Research conducted by English-speaking researchers about other language speaking subjects is essentially cross-cultural and often multilingual, particularly with QR that involves participants communicating in languages other than English" (p. 53). Specifically, Lee addresses the problems that arise in making sense of interview responses in Mandarin, preparing transcriptions of interviews, and translating the Mandarin/Chinese data for an English-speaking/reading audience. Lee's work then demonstrates the importance of reflexivity in cross-language research since the researcher's involvement in the language translation can impact the research process and outcome.

Therefore, to ensure trustworthiness, which is a measure of the rigor of the study, Lincoln & Guba, Sutsrino et al. argue that it is necessary to minimize translation errors, provide detailed accounts of the translation, involve more than one translator, and remain open to inquiry from those seeking access to the translation process. For example, in research conducted in the educational context, Sutsrino et al. recommend that bilingual researchers use an inquiry audit for establishing trustworthiness. Specifically, investigators can require an outside person to review and examine the translation process and the data analysis in order to ensure that the translation is accurate and the findings are consistent.

== International educational organizations ==
=== The Society for Intercultural Education, Training and Research ===
SIETAR is an educational membership organization for those professionals who are concerned with the challenges and rewards of intercultural relations. SIETAR was founded in the United States in 1974 by a few dedicated individuals to draw together professionals engaged in various forms of intercultural learning and engagement research and training. SIETAR now has loosely connected chapters in numerous countries and a large international membership.

=== WYSE International ===
WYSE International is a worldwide educational charity specializing in education and development for emerging leaders established in 1989. It is a non-governmental organization associated with the Department of Public Information of the United Nations.

Over 3000 participants from 110 countries have attended their courses, which have run on 5 continents. Its flagship International Leadership Programme is a 12-day residential course for 30 people from on average 20 countries (aged 18 – 35).

WYSE International's website states it aims to:

"provide education independently of political, religious or social backgrounds and promote visionary leadership capable of responding to evolving world needs."

=== Middle East Entrepreneurs of Tomorrow ===
Middle East Entrepreneurs of Tomorrow is an educational initiative aimed at creating a common professional language between Israeli and Palestinian young leaders. Israeli and Palestinian students are selected through an application process and work in small bi-national teams to develop technology and business projects for local impact. Through this process of cross-cultural communication, students build mutual respect, cultural competence and understanding of each other.

The main theories for cross-cultural communication are based on the work done looking at value differences between different cultures, especially the works of Edward T. Hall, Richard D. Lewis, Geert Hofstede, and Fons Trompenaars. Clifford Geertz was also a contributor to this field. Also Jussi V. Koivisto's model on cultural crossing in internationally operating organizations elaborates from this base of research.

Multiple theorists have contributed to cross-cultural communication, but one of the most used approaches is Hofstede’s model of cultural dimensions, which explains how cultural values help influence communication. Hofstede identified dimensions like power distance, individualism versus collectivism, and uncertainty avoidance, which help explain differences in how people communicate across cultures. These dimensions can affect how people express ideas, respond to authority, and interact in both social and professional settings. They also help explain why communication styles might seem different or unfamiliar when people from different cultures interact with each other. These dimensions can also influence expectations in conversations, like how direct or indirect people are when talking. This makes Hofstede’s model useful for understanding both cultural differences and communication behaviors in real-life situations.

One example of this is power distance, which describes how a culture sees authority and inequality between people. In cultures with high power distance, communication is usually more formal and respectful to people in authority and individuals may avoid questioning people higher than them. For example, students may not question their instructors and employees think more carefully about disagreeing with their higher-ups. In cultures with low power distance, people tend to see everyone as more equal and communicate more directly and openly. These differences can affect how people give feedback, share ideas, or work in groups. They can also have an influence on how comfortable people are speaking up in different situations. For example, students may question something an instructor has done or an employee may disagree verbally with someone in authority. Because of this, misunderstandings can happen when people from different cultures are expecting different communication styles. Understanding power distance can really help explain these differences and improve communication between people from other cultural backgrounds.

These theories have been applied to a variety of different communication theories and settings, including general business and management (Fons Trompenaars and Charles Hampden-Turner) and marketing (Marieke de Mooij, Stephan Dahl). There have also been several successful educational projects which concentrate on the practical applications of these theories in cross-cultural situations.

These theories have been criticized mainly by management scholars (e.g. Nigel Holden) for being based on the culture concept derived from 19th century cultural anthropology and emphasizing culture-as-difference and culture-as-essence. Another criticism has been the uncritical way Hofstede's dimensions are served up in textbooks as facts (Peter W. Cardon). There is a move to focus on 'cross-cultural interdependence' instead of the traditional views of comparative differences and similarities between cultures. Cross-cultural management is increasingly seen as a form of knowledge management. While there is debate in academia, over what cross-cultural teams can do in practice, a meta-analysis by Günter Stahl, Martha Maznevski, Andreas Voigt and Karsten Jonsen on research done on multicultural groups, concluded "Research suggests that cultural diversity leads to process losses through task conflict and decreased social integration, but to process gains through increased creativity and satisfaction."

== Aspects ==
Several parameters may be perceived differently by people of different cultures:

- High- and low-context cultures: context is the most important cultural dimension and also difficult to define. The idea of context in culture was advanced by the anthropologist Edward T Hall. He divides culture into two main groups: High and low-context cultures. He refers to context as the stimuli, environment or ambiance surrounding the environment. Depending on how a culture relies on the three points to communicate their meaning, it will place them in either high or low- context cultures. For example, Hall goes on to explain that low-context cultures assume that the individuals know very little about what they are being told, and therefore must be given a lot of background information. High-context cultures assume the individual is knowledgeable about the subject and has to be given very little background information.
- Nonverbal, oral and written: the main goal behind improving intercultural communication is to pay special attention to specific areas of communication to enhance the effectiveness of the intercultural messages. The specific areas are broken down into three subcategories: nonverbal, oral and written messages.

Nonverbal contact involves everything from something as obvious as eye contact and facial expressions to more discreet forms of expression such as the use of space. Experts have labeled the term kinesics to mean communicating through body movement. Huseman, author of Business Communication, explains that the two most prominent ways of communication through kinesics are eye contact and facial expressions.

Eye contact, Huseman goes on to explain, is the key factor in setting the tone between two individuals and greatly differs in meaning between cultures. In the Americas and Western Europe, eye contact is interpreted the same way, conveying interest and honesty. People who avoid eye contact when speaking are viewed in a negative light, withholding information and lacking in general confidence. However, in the Middle East, Africa, and especially Asia, eye contact is seen as disrespectful and even challenging of one's authority. People who make eye contact, but only briefly, are seen as respectful and courteous.

Facial expressions are their own language by comparison and universal throughout all cultures. Dale Leathers, for example, states that facial expression can communicate ten basic classes of meaning.

The final part of nonverbal communication lies in our gestures, and can be broken down into five subcategories:

- Emblems

Emblems refer to sign language (such as a thumbs-up, one of the most recognized symbols in the world)

- Illustrators

Illustrators mimic what is spoken (such as gesturing how much time is left by holding up a certain number of fingers).

- Regulators

Regulators act as a way of conveying meaning through gestures (raising a hand for instance indicates that one has a certain question about what was just said) and become more complicated since the same regulator can have different meanings across different cultures (making a circle with a hand, for instance, in the Americas means agreement, in Japan is symbolic for money, and in France conveys the notion of worthlessness).

- Affect displays

Affect displays reveal emotions such as happiness (through a smile) or sadness (mouth trembling, tears).

- Adaptors

Adaptors are more subtle such as a yawn or clenching fists in anger.

The last nonverbal type of communication deals with communication through the space around people, or proxemics. Huseman goes on to explain that Hall identifies three types of space:

1. Feature-fixed space: deals with how cultures arrange their space on a large scale, such as buildings and parks.
2. Semifixed feature space: deals with how space is arranged inside buildings, such as the placement of desks, chairs and plants.
3. Informal space: the space and its importance, such as talking distance, how close people sit to one another and office space are all examples. A production line worker often has to make an appointment to see a supervisor, but the supervisor is free to visit the production line workers at will.

Oral and written communication is generally easier to learn, adapt and deal with in the business world for the simple fact that each language is unique. The one difficulty that comes into play is paralanguage, how something is said.

== Differences between westerners and indigenous Australians ==
In the view of Australian linguists, such as Michael Walsh and Ghil'ad Zuckermann, conversations between people from western cultures are usually: "dyadic" – i.e. a dialogue between two specific people; direct eye contact is important; whichever person is speaking at a particular point in time controls the interaction, and; conversations are "contained", in a relatively short, well-defined time frame.

Indigenous Australian conversational interactions – in contrast to those of westerners – tend to be: "communal" or multilateral, i.e. they involve several people simultaneously; direct eye contact is not important (or even deliberately minimised); listeners control the interaction, and; conversations are "continuous" or episodic, spread over a longer, less definite timeframe.

== Challenges ==
Different spoken languages

Spoken language is the most important communication tool between people. Spoken language is seen as people's natural production tool, more common and normal, while written language is seen as intricate because of its broad rules. The same language has different meanings in different contexts. When two countries that use the same language communicate, there may also be some misunderstandings due to some dialects. American English and British English is an example for when two different of cross-cultural communication.

== See also ==
- The Contact Zone (theoretical concept)
- Cross-cultural
- Cross-cultural studies
- Cultural bias
- Cultural competence
- Cultural diversity
- Cultural sensitivity
- Intercultural communication principles
- Intercultural relations
- Interculturality
- International Association for Translation and Intercultural Studies
- Translation
- Intercultural communication
- Human communication

== Footnotes ==
- Mary Ellen Guffey, Kathy Rhodes, Patricia Rogin. "Communicating Across Cultures." Mary Ellen Guffey, Kathy Rhodes, Patricia Rogin. Business Communication Process and Production. Nelson Education Ltd., 2010. 68–89.
