= Seth Schwartz (psychologist) =

American psychologist

Seth J. Schwartz
- Born: 1971 (age 53–54); New York, New York
- Education: Florida State University; Florida International University
- Known for: identity studies, acculturation, cultural stress, crisis migration
- Spouse: Lisa Rodriguez-Schwartz (m. 2000)
- Children: 2
- Scientific career
- Fields: Cross-cultural psychology Developmental psychology Social psychology
- Institutions: University of Miami; University of Texas at Austin
- Thesis: The exploration enhancement workshop: An exploration-based approach to facilitating identity formation in young adults (2000)
- Doctoral advisor: William M. Kurtines
- Website: sethjschwartz.com

Seth J. Schwartz (born 1971) is an American developmental psychologist who is a professor in the Department of Kinesiology and Health Education in the University of Texas at Austin College of Education. He is the editor-in-chief of the International Journal of Intercultural Relations. He joined the faculty of the University of Texas at Austin in January 2021 after teaching at the University of Miami from 2000 to 2020.

Schwartz is author of The Savvy Academic: Publishing in the Social and Health Sciences. He is also senior editor of The Handbook of Identity Theory and Research and The Oxford Handbook of Acculturation and Health.

While he was pursuing his doctoral degree at Florida International University, Schwartz met and married Lisa Rodriguez, who is of Puerto Rican descent. They have two children. They reside in Cedar Park, Texas, and maintain a home in Pembroke Pines, Florida.
