= Eivind Engebretsen =

Norwegian professor of health science

- Born: November 17, 1974 (age 51); Norway
- Education: University of Oslo
- Occupations: Professor University of Oslo and Dean Circle U. European University Alliance

Eivind Engebretsen (born in Oslo, November 17, 1974) is a Norwegian researcher in the medical humanities. He is a full professor of interdisciplinary health science at the Institute of Health and Society (HELSAM) at the University of Oslo.

From 2023, he is appointed as Dean of the Circle U. European University Alliance and has the overall academic responsibility for Circle U.'s educational program.

Engebretsen is Director and Co-Founder of the Faculty of Medicine’s Centre of Excellence in Sustainable Healthcare Education (SHE), which is the first Norwegian Centre of Excellence in medical education.

== Education and professional career ==
Engebretsen obtained his master's degree in intellectual history from the University of Oslo in 2001 and his PhD from the same university in 2006. From 2007 to 2011 he worked as an associate professor in philosophy of science at the Oslo and Akershus University College of Applied Sciences. He has also worked as an assistant professor at the University of Lorraine in France (2001-2002) and as a senior adviser in NORAD's evaluation department (2006-2009). He has been a board member of the International Society for Cultural History and the alternate Norwegian Member of the Helsinki Group on Gender in Research and Innovation. In 2016-2017 Engebretsen was member of one of the expert groups for the interim evaluation of the European research programme, Horizon 2020. From 2015 to 2019 he was the Research Director at the Faculty of Medicine with the academic responsibility for the first medical postdoctoral training programme in Norway. In 2017 he was elected a fellow and a group leader at the Centre for Advanced Study at the Norwegian Academy of Science and Letters.

In 2021, Engebretsen was appointed as Chair of Global Health at the European University Alliance Circle U with the mission to explore the interface between global health and democracy, and he is a member of the Circle U Chairs Academy.

From 2019 to 2022 he was the Vice-Dean of Postgraduate Studies at Faculty of Medicine.

== Research ==
As a scholar of the medical humanities, most of Engebretsen's research centres around the following questions: who is legitimized to speak on whose behalf about health, and what are the discursive mechanisms on which this legitimacy is based?

Knowledge trajectories and decision making in health care have been an important area of interest. His research has been concerned with the discourse of ‘knowledge translation’ and how this discourse might be expanded by drawing on theories of translation from linguistics, philosophy and anthropology. His work in this area has created international debate.

Together with the philosopher and psychoanalyst Julia Kristeva, Engebretsen has advocated a "translational medical humanities" approach that not only considers the humanities as a corrective to biomedicine, but challenges to the whole distinction between medicine and the humanities.

Engebretsen's research and publishing activities are characterized by border crossing and bridging between different scientific disciplines. He has published around 200 scientific publications, including articles in renowned scientific journals such as the Lancet, the BMJ and Social History. He has also written and edited several books. In his most recent book, Rethinking Evidence in the Time of Pandemics (Cambridge University Press, 2022; co-authored with Mona Baker), he demonstrates how effective story-telling can enhance the reception of medical knowledge and reduce some of the sources of resistance and misunderstanding that plague public communication about the COVID-19 pandemic and other medical emergencies.

== List of publications ==
Cristin (The Norwegian Scientific Index)
