= José Lambert =

Belgian scholar

- Born: 1941 (age 84–85); Wingene, Belgium

Academic background
- Thesis: Ludwig Tieck dans les lettres francaises: aspects d'une resistance au romantisme allemand (1972)

Academic work
- Discipline: Translation Studies, Comparative Literature
- Institutions: KU Leuven

José Lambert (born 1941) is a Professor of Comparative Literature at KU Leuven, Belgium, and is best known for his work in Translation Studies. He is also noted for leading international initiatives in this field.

== Biography ==
Lambert studied French Language and Literature at the Katholieke Universiteit Leuven. In 1972, he obtained his doctorate in Comparative Literature with work on the reception of Ludwig Tieck. He then started teaching at the same university, becoming full professor in 1979. He became Emeritus Professor of the Katholieke Universiteit Leuven in 2006.

Since 2011 he has been Visiting Professor at the Universidade Federal de Santa Catarina, Florianopolis, Brazil. Lambert has been a guest professor at Penn State University, New York University, the University of Alberta, the University of Amsterdam and the Sorbonne. He was European Secretary of the International Comparative Literature Association from 1985 to 1991.

As Lambert focused on addressing problems of interliterary contacts, he became a notable figure in the emergent discipline of translation studies. Lambert has authored more than 150 research papers and published several books on comparative literature and Translation Studies.

== Initiatives ==
In 1989, Lambert created a special research program in Translation Studies at KU Leuven. This was to become the basis of the Centre for Translation Studies (CETRA), a research summer school of which Lambert is Honorary President. The center, which also offers a PhD curriculum, has attracted talents from all over the world. In 1989 Lambert co-founded Target, International Journal of Translation Studies with Gideon Toury.

== Works ==
- Lambert, José. 1976. Ludwig Tieck dans les lettres francaises : aspects d'une resistance au romantisme allemand. Louvain : Presses universitaires de Louvain.
- Delabastita, Dirk, Lieven D'Hulst, Reine Meylaerts (eds) (2006) Functional Approaches to Culture And Translation: Selected Papers by José Lambert. Amsterdam and Philadelphia: Benjamins.
- Cornillie, B., Ed., Lambert, J., Ed., Swiggers, P. eds. 2009. Linguistic Identities, Language shift and Language policy in Europe. Leuven - Paris - Walpole: Peeters.
- De Geest, D., Ed., de Graef, O., Ed., Delabastita, D., Ed., Geldof, K., Ed., Ghesquière, R., Ed., Lambert, J. eds. 2000. Under construction: links for the site of literary theory. Leuven university press, Leuven.
- Baetens, J., Ed., Lambert, J., eds. 2000. The future of cultural studies: - essays in honour of Joris Vlasselaers. Leuven university press, Leuven.
- Boyden, M., Lambert, J., Meylaerts, R. (2005). La lengua de la literatura: la institucionalización por la mediación del discurso. Revista electrónica de estudios filológicos, 9.
- Janssens, M., Lambert, J., Steyaert, C. (2004). Developing language strategies for international companies: the contribution of translation studies. Journal of World Business, 39 (4), 414-430.
