= Target (journal) =

- Discipline: Translation Studies
- Language: English
- Edited by: Haidee Kotze, Douglas Robinson

Publication details
- History: 1989-present
- Publisher: John Benjamins (The Netherlands)
- Frequency: 3 issues per year
- Open access: optional
- Impact factor: 0.605 (2019)

Standard abbreviations
- ISO 4: Target

Indexing
- ISSN: 0924-1884 (print); 1569-9986 (web)
- OCLC no.: 849373155

Links
- Journal homepage

Target: International Journal of Translation Studies is a triannual peer-reviewed academic journal covering translation studies. It was established in 1989 by the translation scholars Gideon Toury and José Lambert and is published by John Benjamins.

== Abstracting and indexing ==
This journal is abstracted and indexed in:

- Arts & Humanities Citation Index
- Current Contents/Arts & Humanities
- Current Contents/Social & Behavioral Sciences
- ERIH PLUS
- Linguistics Abstracts Online
- LLBA
- MLA International Bibliography
- Scopus
- Social Sciences Citation Index
- Translation Studies Bibliography

According to the Journal Citation Reports, the journal has a 2019 impact factor of 0.605.
