= Society for Intercultural Education, Training and Research =

The Society for Intercultural Education, Training and Research (SIETAR) was founded in 1974 as an interdisciplinary network for trainers and researchers in the area of intercultural and cross-cultural communication.

As of 2004, SIETAR had a network of national and regional professional networks with more than 3,000 members worldwide. It holds NGO status with the United Nations. Kathryn Sorrells states that it "played a central role in facilitating collaboration among intercultural practitioners". For a time, SIETAR was the publisher of the International Journal of Intercultural Relations before the publication was taken over by the International Academy of Intercultural Research.

SIETAR has many different bodies, like Argentina, Austria, Brazil, British Columbia, Bulgaria, Europe, France, Germany, India, Ireland, Italy, Japan, Netherlands, Poland, Spain, Switzerland, United Kingdom, USA, and Young Sietar.

== Foundation ==
L. Robert Kohls is a founding member.
