= Wilhelm Viëtor =

Phonetician

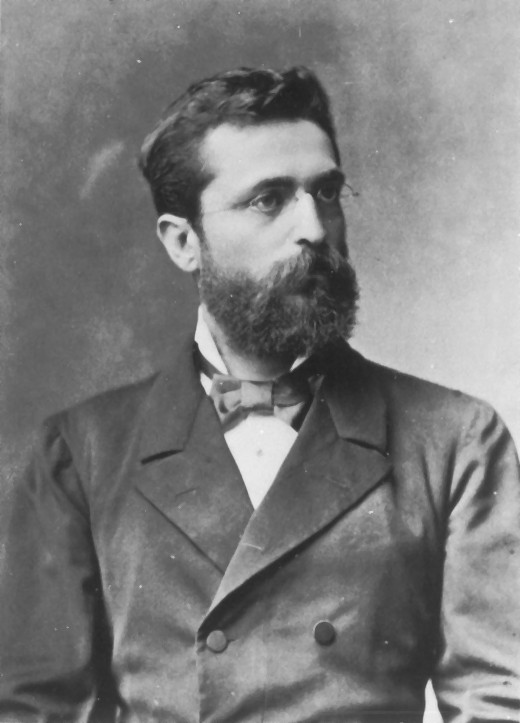
- Viëtor in 1886
- Born: Carl Adolf Theodor Wilhelm Viëtor; 25 December 1850; Nassau, Rhineland-Palatinate, Germany
- Died: 22 September 1918 (aged 67); Marburg, Hess, Germany
- Title: President of the International Phonetic Association (1888–1918)

Academic background
- Education: University of Marburg (PhD)

Academic work
- Discipline: Linguistics
- Sub-discipline: Phonetics
- Institutions: University of Marburg
- Notable works: Der Sprachunterricht muss umkehren! (1882); Elemente der Phonetik (1884)

Carl Adolf Theodor Wilhelm Viëtor (German: [ˈvɪlhɛlm ˈfiːetoːɐ̯]; 25 December 1850 – 22 September 1918) was a German phonetician and language educator. He was a central figure in the Reform Movement in language education of the late 19th century, which sought to replace the traditional grammar–translation method with oral language teaching.

He was one of the early members of the International Phonetic Association, founded by Paul Passy in 1886, alongside leading British phonetician Henry Sweet, and served as its president from 1888 until his death.

In 1981, German phonetician Klaus J. Kohler described Viëtor as "the most outstanding figure in the field of descriptive and practical phonetics of individual languages in Germany at the turn of the century".

== Life and career ==
The son of a pastor, Viëtor studied theology and philology at the Universities of Leipzig, Berlin, and Marburg, where he received a PhD in philology in 1875. He taught English and French in Düsseldorf, Wiesbaden, and Friedrichsdorf from 1876 to 1882.

In 1882, Viëtor published an influential pamphlet titled Der Sprachunterricht muss umkehren! ("Language teaching must start afresh!") under the pseudonym Quousque Tandem (taken from the opening words of Cicero's speech to Catiline), which spurred the Reform Movement in foreign language teaching in Europe. Its English translation, by A. P. R. Howatt and David Abercrombie, was published in 1984.

In 1884, Viëtor was appointed associate professor of English philology at the University of Marburg. In 1886, Viëtor joined the International Phonetic Association founded by Paul Passy, then known as the Phonetic Teachers' Association, of which he became President two years later. He launched the phonetics journal Phonetische Studien in 1888 and the language teaching journal Die neueren Sprachen, which absorbed the former, in 1893.

Viëtor authored two successful textbooks in phonetics: Elemente der Phonetik, first published in 1884, went through seven editions by 1923; Die Aussprache des Schriftdeutschen, first published in 1895, reached its eleventh edition in 1925. He also revised and edited works by the British phonetician Laura Soames, including Introduction to English, French and German Phonetics (1899). Viëtor also compiled Deutsches Aussprachewörterbuch (1912), which likely played a role in inspiring Daniel Jones to publish the English Pronouncing Dictionary (1917).

From 1899 to 1901, Viëtor held summer schools at Marburg, which were attended by language teachers from all over Europe.
