= Gideon Toury =

Israeli translation scholar

- גדעון טורי
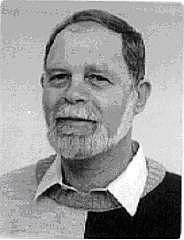
- Born: 6 June 1942; Haifa, Israel
- Died: 4 October 2016 (aged 74)

Academic background
- Education: University of Tel Aviv

Academic work
- School or tradition: Descriptive Translation Studies
- Notable works: Descriptive Translation Studies and Beyond
- Notable ideas: Translation norms, Pseudo-translation

Gideon Toury (Hebrew: גדעון טורי; 6 June 1942 – 4 October 2016) was an Israeli translation scholar and professor of Poetics, Comparative Literature and Translation Studies at Tel Aviv University, where he held the M. Bernstein Chair of Translation Theory. Gideon Toury was a pioneer of Descriptive Translation Studies.

== Biography ==
Gideon Toury was born in Haifa, the first child of the historian Jacob Toury (1915–2004) and his wife Eve. He completed high school at the Reali School in Haifa in 1960. After high-school, he did his military service in the Nahal Brigade and the paratroopers and as part of his training was sent to a kibbutz, to help out with the farming. He lived there for six years, and he ended up editing the kibbutz journal and organizing cultural events. This experience helped him obtaining a position in a children's journal, where he did his first translations, and later as the editor of the Hebrew version of Popular Photography.

He graduated with honors in Hebrew language and Literature at Tel Aviv University in 1970, and completed a PhD Literary Theory at the same university in 1977 on the topic of Translational Norms and Literary Translation into Hebrew, 1930-1945. In 1980 he won the Hans Christian Andersen Award for his translation into Hebrew of C.S. Lewis The Voyage of the Dawn Treader. He was the first chair professor in CETRA, the research program in Translation Studies created by Jose Lambert in 1989. In 1999, he was awarded honorary membership of the UNESCO Chair of Translation Studies at Comenius University, Bratislava, Slovakia. In 2000, he was awarded an honorary doctorate by Middlesex University, London.

From 1970 to 1983, he worked with Benjamin Harshav, Itamar Even-Zohar and Menachem Perry in the journal Literature and in 1989 he founded Target, International Journal of Translation Studies and has been general editor since. He is also General Editor of the Benjamins Translation Library. He was also a member of the boards of The Translator and the Translation Studies Abstracts until he was "unappointed" following the decision of Mona Baker to boycott Israeli academia.

== Research ==
His main research is on the theory of translation and descriptive translation studies, with emphasis on the history of the Hebrew translation of the Bible to the present.

According to Toury, there are prescriptive and descriptive studies. Prescriptive approaches aim to formulate rules that should be followed by anyone who produces a text of a given type. They are focused on finding the most optimal or correct solutions. Descriptive approaches are about looking into existing texts and describing the rules they seem to follow.

He came up with the term "translation norms", as hidden rules followed by the majority discovered by descriptive observation of actual translation. They are not understood as prescriptive rules but as norms specific to a context. Therefore, norms change with time and culture, so translation re-visits the same problem over and over again.

== Publications ==
He has published three books, a number of edited volumes and numerous articles, in both English and Hebrew, in the fields of translation theory and comparative literature. His articles have also appeared in translation in many other languages, and he is himself an active translator too (with about 30 books and many articles to his credit).

=== Books in English ===
- In Search of a Theory of Translation. Tel Aviv: The Porter Institute for Poetics and Semiotics, Tel Aviv University. 1980.
- Descriptive Translation Studies and Beyond. Amsterdam/Philadelphia: John Benjamins. 1995.

=== Edited books ===
- Translation Theory: A Reader.Tel Aviv University: Dyonun. 1980.(English and Hebrew)
- With Itamar Even-Zohar.Translation Theory and Intercultural RelationsThe Porter Institute for Poetics and Semiotics, Tel Aviv University. 1981.
- Translation Across Cultures.New Delhi: Bahri Publications. 1987.
- Introducing Translation Theory: Selected Articles.Tel Aviv University: Dyonun. 1991. 198 pp. (English and Hebrew)

=== Edited Journals ===
- Target, International Journal of Translation Studies. Amsterdam: John Benjamins, 1989-. (with José Lambert.)
- TRANSST: An International Newsletter of Translation Studies. 1987-. (with the help of José Lambert)

=== Literary Translations into Hebrew ===
- Sheila Burnford. The Incredible Journey. 1970.
- John Masefield. The Midnight Folk. 1971.
- Francis Scott Fitzgerald. The Great Gatsby. 1974.
- Arthur Miller. All My Sons. 1976.
- Günter Grass. Katz und Maus. 1976.
- Ernest Hemingway. A Moveable Feast. (3 Kap.)
- Ford Madox Ford. The Good Soldier. 1977.
- Clive Staples Lewis. The Magician's Nephew. 1978.
- Uwe Johnson. Zwei Ansichten. 1978.
- Clive Staples Lewis. The Voyage of the Dawn Treader. 1979.
- Jerome David Salinger. The Laughing Man. 1979.
- Peter Handke. Die Angst des Tormanns beim Elfmeter. 1979.
- Beverly Cleary. Henry Huggins. 1979.
- Clive Staples Lewis. Prince Caspian. 1980.
- John Cheever. Falconer. 1981.
- Thomas Pynchon. Mortality and Mercy in Vienna. 1981.
- John Steinbeck. The Moon Is Down. 1981.
- Clive Staples Lewis. The Horse and His Boy. 1982.
- Christiane Felscherinow. Wir Kinder vom Bahnhof Zoo. 1982.
- Clive Staples Lewis. The Silver Chair. 1983.
- Mark Twain. A Connecticut Yankee in King Arthur's Court. 1983.
- Clive Staples Lewis. The Last Battle. 1984.
- Heinrich Böll. Das Vermächtnis. 1984.
- John Cheever. Bullet Park. 1985.
- Ernest Hemingway. For Whom the Bell Tolls. 1986.
- Arthur Conan Doyle. The Lost World. 1986.
- Heinrich Mann. Szene. 1987.
- Thornton Wilder. The Bridge of San Luis Rey. 1988.
- Gert Hofmann: Auf dem Turm. 1991.
- Nevil Shute. Pied Piper. 1991.
- Heinrich Böll. Two short stories. 1993.
- Thomas Mann. Königliche Hoheit. 1994.
- Cormac McCarthy. All the Pretty Horses. 1995.
