= Fons Trompenaars =

Dutch organizational theorist, management consultant and author

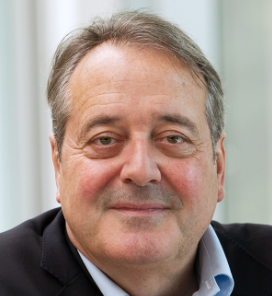
Fons Trompenaars

Alfonsus (Fons) Trompenaars (born 1953, Amsterdam) is a Dutch organizational theorist, management consultant, trainer, motivational speaker and writer, known for the development of his model of national culture differences and dilemma theory.

== Biography ==
He was born to a French mother and a Dutch father. In 1979, Trompenaars received an MA in economics at the VU Amsterdam and in 1983 a PhD from the Wharton School in Philadelphia for his thesis, entitled The Organization of Meaning and the Meaning of Organization.

In 1981 Trompenaars started his career at the Royal Dutch Shell Personnel Division, working on job classification and management development. In 1989, together with Charles Hampden-Turner, he founded and directed the consultancy firm Centre for International Business Studies, working for such companies as BP, Philips, IBM, Heineken, AMD, Mars, Motorola, General Motors, Merrill Lynch, Johnson & Johnson, Pfizer, ABN AMRO, ING, PepsiCo, Honeywell. In 1998 the company was bought by KPMG and renamed Trompenaars Hampden-Turner.

Trompenaars was awarded the International Professional Practice Area Research Award by the American Society for Training and Development (ASTD) in 1991. Subsequently, in 1999 Business magazine ranked him as one of the top 5 management consultants next to Michael Porter, Tom Peters and Edward de Bono. In 2011, he was voted one of the top 20 HR Most Influential International Thinkers by HR Magazine. In 2015, he was once again ranked in the Thinkers50 of the most influential management thinkers alive and in 2017 inducted into the Thinkers50 Hall of Fame. Fons is the recipient of the George Petitpas Award 2023. The AHRI Cross Cultural Management Award, is supported by Fons Trompenaars, acknowledging excellence in fostering cross-cultural inclusion and implementing effective management strategies.

Trompenaars wrote Riding the Waves of Culture, Understanding Cultural Diversity in Business. This book (in its third edition) sold over 120,000 copies and was translated into 16 languages amongst them, French, German, Dutch, Korean, Danish, Turkish, Chinese, Hungarian and Portuguese. He is co-author amongst others of Nine Visions of Capitalism: Unlocking the Meanings of Wealth Creation and Rewarding Performance Globally.

Positions

- Co-director at the Servant-Leadership Centre for Research and Education (SERVUS) at the Vrije Universiteit, Amsterdam.
- Member of Advisory Board Webster University Leiden.
- Distinguished Advisor of Centre for TransCultural Studies at Temasek Polytechnic, Singapore.
- International Director at the International Society for Organisational Development.
- Faculty member at the Global Institute for Leadership Development (GILD).
- Judge of the Fons Trompenaars award for Cross Cultural Management (AHRI).

He has spent over 30 years helping Fortune 500 leaders build meaningful connections to manage and solve their business and cultural dilemmas to increase global effectiveness and performance, particularly in the areas of leadership, innovation, globalization, intercultural understanding and managing culture change by reconciling differences (ethnic, gender or generation based, professional, organizational etc).

== Work ==
=== Trompenaars' model of national culture differences ===
7 dimensions of culture

Trompenaars' model of national culture differences is a framework for cross-cultural communication applied to general business and management, developed by Trompenaars and Charles Hampden-Turner. This model of national culture differences has seven dimensions.

1. Universalism vs. particularism (What is more important, rules or relationships?)
2. Individualism vs. collectivism (communitarianism) (Do we function in a group or as individuals?)
3. Neutral vs. emotional (Do we display our emotions?)
4. Specific vs. diffuse (How separate we keep our private and working lives)
5. Achievement vs. ascription (Do we have to prove ourselves to receive status or is it given to us?)
6. Sequential vs. synchronic (Do we do things one at a time or several things at once?)
7. Internal vs. external control (Do we control our environment or are we controlled by it?)

There are five orientations covering the ways in which human beings deal with each other.

=== Dilemma theory ===
Dilemma theory, as proposed by Fons Trompenaars and Charles Hampden-Turner, is a framework for understanding and managing cultural differences in organizations. Trompenaars and Hampden-Turner suggest that cultural diversity often leads to dilemmas or tensions between conflicting cultural values. These dilemmas can arise in various areas such as communication, decision-making, leadership, and teamwork.

The key premise of dilemma theory is that these cultural dilemmas are not problems to be solved but rather paradoxes to be managed. Instead of trying to eliminate one side of the dilemma in favor of the other, individuals and organizations are most successful if they learn to navigate the tensions between conflicting values.

== Publications ==
Books, a selection

- 1997. Riding The Waves of Culture: Understanding Diversity in Global Business with Charles Hampden-Turner
- 2004. Business Across Cultures (Culture for Business Series) with Peter Woolliams
- 2004. Managing People Across Cultures (Culture for Business Series) with Charles Hampden-Turner
- 2012. Cross-cultural management textbook: Lessons from the world leading experts, Introd. by Edgar Schein, Ed. by Jerome Dumetz, with Charles Hampden-Turner, Meredith Belbin, Jerome Dumetz, Juliette Tournand, Peter Woolliams, Olga Saginova, Stephen M. R. Covey, Dean Foster, Craig Storti, Joerg Schmitz
- 2015. Nine Visions of Capitalism: Unlocking the Meanings of Wealth Creation, with Charles Hampden-Turner

Articles, a selection

- Smith, Peter B., Shaun Dugan, and Fons Trompenaars, "National culture and the values of organizational employees: A Dimensional Analysis across 43 Nations", Journal of Cross-Cultural Psychology 27.2 (1996): 231–264.
- Smith, Peter B., Fons Trompenaars, and Shaun Dugan. "The Rotter locus of control scale in 43 countries: A test of cultural relativity", International Journal of Psychology 30.3 (1995): 377–400.
