= Intercultural communication principles =

Principles for communication between cultures

Intercultural communication principles guide the process of exchanging meaningful and unambiguous information across cultural boundaries, that preserves mutual respect and minimises antagonism. Intercultural communication can be defined simply by the communication between people from two different cultures. In response to the fact that communication between cultures can be challenging, principles have been developed to accommodate respectful inter-cultural conversations. These principles are based upon normative rules, values and needs of individuals, understanding ethics within cultural communication and overcoming pre-existing cultural assumptions towards one another.

For these purposes, culture is a shared system of symbols, beliefs, attitudes, values, expectations, and norms of behaviour. It refers to coherent groups of people whether resident wholly or partly within state territories, or existing without residence in any particular territory. Hence, these principles may have equal relevance when a tourist seeks help, where two well-established independent corporations attempt to merge their operations, and where politicians attempt to negotiate world peace. Two factors have raised the importance of this topic:

- Improvements in communication and transportation technology have made it possible for previously stable cultures to meet in unstructured situations, e.g. the internet opens lines of communication without mediation, while airlines transplant the citizens from different countries into unfamiliar milieux. Experience proves merely crossing cultural boundaries can be considered threatening, while positive attempts to interact may provoke defensive responses. Misunderstanding may be compounded by either an exaggerated sensitivity to possible slights, or an exaggerated and over-protective fear of giving offence;
- Some groups believe that the phenomenon of globalisation has reduced cultural diversity and so reduced the opportunity for misunderstandings, but characterising people as a homogeneous market is simplistic. One product or brand only appeals to the material aspirations of one self-selecting group of buyers, and its sales performance will not affect the vast multiplicity of factors that may separate the cultures.

== What can go wrong? ==
Different cultures encode and decode messages differently, increasing the chances of misunderstanding. Due to different cultural systems and political backgrounds, people from different cultural environments are often easily upset by each other's casual behaviors <Günthner, S., & Luckmann, T, 2001>. The safety-first consequence of recognizing cultural differences should be to assume that others' thoughts and actions are different. Such assumptions stem from potentially devastating ignorance and can lead to much frustration for members of both cultures. Entering a culture with this type of ethnocentrism, the assumption one's own culture is correct, is another byproduct of ignorance and cultural misunderstanding. Depending on a specific culture people may react differently and may take offense, something normal to you and your culture might have a completely different meaning in someone else's perspective. An example of this is the thumbs up hand gesture, it is usually seen as something good and has a positive meaning behind it but, "When it comes to gestures, giving the thumbs-up in Iran is seen as a serious insult, rather than a positive gesture"

=== Rights, values, and needs ===
Some cultural characteristics will be easy to identify: whether people are conscious of status or make displays of material wealth. However, many rights are assumed, values are implied, and needs are unspoken, (for safety, security, love, a sense of belonging to a group, self-esteem, and the ability to attain one's goals).

For example, issues of personal security, dignity, and control will be very different as between an able-bodied and a disabled person. Similarly, there may be problems of respect when a person from a rigidly class-based culture meets a meritocrat or if there is racism, sexism or religious intolerance in play. In such situations, identity is fundamental when disputing the proper role or "place" of the other, about who is in control of their lives, and how they present themselves to the outside world. The reality is more deeply rooted in power https://www.merriam-webster.com/dictionary/culture, who is on top of the social, economic, and/or political hierarchy. Family members or long term rivals may be obsessed with their mutual competition.

=== Intercultural communication ethics ===
Communication is something that no one can escape and it comes in many forms. Whenever a person from one culture sends a message to be processed from a different culture, intercultural communication is present. It is important to recognize when it happens to able to make wise decisions as to how the communication takes place. Intercultural communication ethics incorporates learning about different goods, the discourse that arises from and shapes the texture of those goods, and practices that enable constructive conversation in a postmodern world of difference. In any ethical dilemma situation, hard choices must be made in considering the intent, the action, the means, the consequence, the end goal, the situation, and the embedded cultural contexts of the case. In an intercultural decision-making context, in particular, often difficult choices must be made between upholding one's own cultural beliefs and values and considering the values of the other culture. Acknowledging the different goods, values, and beliefs will help to interact with someone from a different culture. A knowledge of intercultural communication, and the ability to use it effectively, can help bridge cultural differences, mitigate problems, and assist in achieving more harmonious, productive relations. This is especially important in today's world where the market is global.

=== Assumptions ===
People may misinterpret each other's motives. For example, one group may assume that they are simply exchanging information about what they believe, but the other believes that they are negotiating a change in behavior. That is most likely to arise when the parties are not completely honest with each other from the outset. Individuals may wish to protect their privacy, corporations may be concerned about industrial espionage, and politicians may be bound by requirements of secrecy in the national interest. Nevertheless, clarifying the purpose of the interaction is essential to eliminating confusion.

=== Situation ===
If time is not a factor and those interacting approach their meetings with good will and patience, effective communication is more likely. If the parties are under pressure (whether generated by external circumstances or internal needs), emotions may colour the exchange. Prejudice is a shortcut decision-making tool. In a crisis, fear and anger may trigger more aggressive tactics, particularly if the meeting is being staged under the gaze of the news media.

== Improving intercultural communication ==
People can try to do some research about another cultures and communication conventions of those whom they propose to meet to minimise the risk of making the elementary mistakes. Even when all interlocutors speak the same language, steps must be taken to ensure that there is no miscommunication, especially in situations where misunderstandings can have dire consequences. It is also prudent to set a clear agenda so that everyone understands the nature and purpose of the interaction. When language skills are unequal, clarifying one's meaning in five ways will improve communication:

1. Avoid using slang and idioms, choosing words that will convey only the most specific denotative meaning.
2. Listen carefully and, if in doubt, ask for confirmation of understanding (particularly important if local accents and pronunciation are a problem).
3. Recognise that accenting and intonation can cause meaning to vary significantly.
4. Respect the local communication formalities and styles, and watch for any changes in body language.
5. Investigate their culture's perception of your culture by reading literature about one's culture through their eyes before entering into communication with them. This will allow one to prepare yourself for projected views of one's culture that will be borne as a visitor in their culture.
6. Use politeness strategies such as hedging opinions, and making requests that allow freedom of action.
7. Use euphemisms when appropriate. Using euphemistic language properly in communication can take care of the other side's face and make it easier to be accepted by the other side.
8. Identify with the other person's feelings when appropriate (Moeschler, J, 2007).

If it is not possible to learn the other's language, show some respect by learning a few words. In all important exchanges, a translator can convey the message.

When writing, the choice of words represent the relationship between the reader and the writer so more thought and care should be invested in the text, since it may be thoroughly analysed by the recipient.

== See also ==
- Cross-cultural communication
- Culture shock
- Intercultural communication
- Intercultural competence
- Grounding in communication
