= Teaching prosody =

Language teaching technique

Prosody is an important component of spoken language, and learners often need help to perceive and produce the prosody of a new language. Yet language teaching often includes little coverage of prosody. The improvement of prosody teaching is an active research area.

== Second language learners ==
While all languages have prosody, they differ in their inventories of prosodic patterns and in what these patterns convey.

The use of proper prosody can increase intelligibility, make it easier for listeners to understand the speaker. This is true across languages. In English, word stress is less important than, for example, tone in Mandarin, but is still essential for full intelligibility. The use of proper prosody also affects listeners’ judgments of proficiency, and competence. One study showed that 35-41% of English proficiency judgments in classroom presentations were explained by prosody quality, notably including the accuracy of word stress placement and the use of a wide pitch range.

Prosody also contributes to communicative effectiveness, especially in dialog and in outside-the-classroom use. Learners need prosodic skills in order to: track what is being said and its social meaning, effectively express their own feelings and intentions, execute social actions such as offering, apologizing, and praising, and, often, to be accepted. In a seminal study Gumperz observed a group of cafeteria workers from South Asia who had been called out, by their British customers, for being disrespectful. Gumperz noticed that the way they offered side dishes, with a falling intonation, gravy>, conveyed, to the English speakers, a message of “take it or leave it, I don’t care”. The workers had no such intention, as falling intonation was a polite and proper way to make an offer in their native language. Neither group was consciously aware of the difference. This illustrates how misperceptions of prosody, with its powerful interpersonal functions, can cause mere language differences to be attributed to bad attitudes and improper intents, especially in cross-cultural situations.

== Native speakers ==
Native speakers’ prosodic ability levels vary widely. Even adept speakers may feel inadequate in high-stakes situations, such as public speaking, and may turn to coaching to project more charisma. People may also seek help with interviewing skills and with active listening and other skills that are important in business and relationships. Many autistic speakers have a limited ability to perceive and use prosody, especially for pragmatic and interpersonal functions, and may benefit from prosody training.

== Teaching topics and methods ==
There is no standard curriculum for teaching prosody, but the following aspects are often addressed.

- Learners may need more awareness. While learners generally understand the importance of learning words and mastering grammar, they may need help to see the importance of prosody.
- Learners may be motivated by a focus on functions, highlighting what specific pragmatic functions that can be achieved with the right prosody.
- Learners may need better perception skills . While usually subconscious and effortless in a native language, learning to hear the elements of prosody (pitch, loudness, duration, voicing properties, phonetic reduction, etc.) can help them be more sensitive to the prosodic patterns of a language. This can benefit from diagrams and from hand gestures.
- Learners may need to know the facts of prosody for the language of interest: the patterns and their uses. Concrete, situated, examples taken from recordings of real people in real dialog can be motivating and informative.
- Listeners may need to improve their production skills. Good feedback on their performance is invaluable for this. Software applications may be a useful supplement to in-person teachers.
- Learners need practice. After acquiring the patterns, they need to learn to produce them in real time. They also need to learn to combine patterns to convey the precisely nuanced meaning they want to convey. For this, realistic role-play exercises can be helpful, as can a “safe space” for practice. Learners may fear being judged. While, if someone pronounces some sounds incorrectly, interlocutors will likely understand that foreigners will naturally have a "foreign" accent, inappropriate prosody may be judged as an indication of a bad attitude. Learners may avoid risk by restricting themselves to monotone voices, but this is limiting.

== See also ==
- Articulatory approach for teaching pronunciation
- Communicative language teaching
- Language pedagogy
