= International Journal of Intercultural Relations =

- Discipline: Intercultural relations
- Language: English
- Edited by: Seth Schwartz

Publication details
- History: 1977–present
- Publisher: Elsevier
- Frequency: Bimonthly
- Impact factor: 2.667 (2020)

Standard abbreviations
- ISO 4: Int. J. Intercult. Relat.

Indexing
- ISSN: 0147-1767
- LCCN: 78646668

Links
- Journal homepage; Online archive

The International Journal of Intercultural Relations is a bimonthly peer-reviewed academic journal covering intercultural relations. It was established in 1977 and is the official journal of the International Academy for Intercultural Research. It is published by Elsevier and the editor-in-chief is Seth Schwartz (University of Texas at Austin). According to the Journal Citation Reports, the journal has a 2020 impact factor of 2.667.
