= Prosodic construction =

A prosodic construction is a temporal configuration of prosodic features that bears meaning. Prosodic features include pitch, intensity (perceived as loudness), duration, creaky voice, breathy voice, and so on. These can combine in specific patterns to convey meanings and attitudes like contrast, complaint, mockery, losing interest in a topic, assessing something positively, holding the turn, and so on.

== Lexically-bound constructions ==
Many prosodic constructions are associated with specific word sequences.

the phrase "tell me about it" said as an ironic rejoinder, implying the speaker already knows from personal experience

For example the phrase tell me about it when used as an ironic rejoinder is typically spoken slowly and with falling pitch, and with an "assertive" initial stress on the word tell. Some instances also include nasality, creaky voice, narrow pitch range after the initial stress, and a late peak on "tell", as heard in the example.

Another example is the word "awww" used to praise a baby as cute, where the prosody includes high pitch with a slight sag towards the middle, extreme lengthening, relative loudness, creaky voice, and nasality.

== General constructions ==
knock-knock, as the start of a joke

peek-a-boo, as might be said to an infant

Other prosodic constructions are "general prosodic constructions" that can be "superimposed on" various verbal content. An example is the Minor-Third Construction, a common way to call to get someone's attention, as in Isa_{bel} or Excuse _{me}, or to cue some action, as in go _{for it}, knock _{knock}, and peek_{-a-boo} in infant-directed speech . In addition to the salient pitch downstep, this construction involves pitch high in the speaker's range; flat pitch before and after the downstep; lengthening, especially on the first syllable; and a clear, highly harmonic voice, as opposed to a creaky or breathy one. As another example, German rhetorical questions, such as wer mag denn Fusspilz? (who wants athlete's foot?)

A rhetorical question in German: Wer mag denn Fusspilz? (Who wants athletes foot?)

can be lexically identical to sincere questions, but often use a prosodic construction with slow speaking rate, breathiness after the first words, and a low final pitch.

== See also ==
- English Prosody#Pragmatic Prosody
