= English prosody =

Prosody in English conveys many pragmatic functions relating to speech acts, attitude, turn-taking, topic structure, information structure and more. It also helps mark lexical identity, grammatical structure, semantic elements, and more.

The component features of English prosody – pitch, loudness, duration, voice qualities, and so on – are the same as those of other languages. However the ways that these combine and the meanings of those combinations are often unique to English.

== Lexical and syntactic prosody ==
Each English word has an associated stress pattern: each syllable is stressed or unstressed. Unstressed syllables are generally lower in pitch, quieter, shorter, and typically also phonetically reduced, notably with the vowels nearer to schwa. Many languages mark syllable stress and its absence with some of these features, but rely on them to different extents; others lack stress of this kind entirely.

For any given word, the citation-form stress pattern is fixed, and, while the stress patterns of English words do not reliably follow general rules, there are some tendencies. For example, most English names have stress on the first syllable, as in Jennifer, most long nouns tend to have stress on the antepenultimate (third-from-last) syllable, as in comMUnicate. The location of stress in words formed by compounding is generally governed by the stress properties of the specific affixes involved, for example the -ization of nationaliZAtion and the -ic of proSOdic.

In English, such stress patterns carry relatively little functional load, especially in contrast to tone languages, such as Mandarin. That is, there are few word pairs which are phonetically identical but distinguished by prosody alone, with CONduct/conDUCT being one of the rare examples. Nevertheless, correct positioning of stress is an important part of the language and greatly helps listeners to identify the words intended.

In ongoing speech, the lexical stress patterns can be affected by the neighboring words and by syntactic and semantic structures. For example, green house and greenhouse differ in that the second word loses stress in the latter, and generally this type of semantic combination exhibits this prosodic pattern. There are many ways that prosody marks how words combine into phrases, often marked primarily at the phrase boundaries.

== Pragmatic prosody ==
While the aspects discussed above can be seen in monologue speech, the prosody of dialog is much richer. The ultimate purposes of dialog – suggesting, persuading, building rapport, enjoying each other's company, comparing perspectives, making plans, and so on – are typically accomplished in part through the use of various prosodic patterns. This is a characteristic of English: it uses prosody to convey many pragmatic functions which other languages convey lexically.

Sometimes these are conveyed mostly through pitch, in the so-called intonation contours. For example, the contradiction contour, also known as the consider this construction, as in an instance of "I'm NOT going to JaPAN" said to correct an interlocutor's misconception, consists of a region of narrow pitch that is bookended by two pitch excursions, here indicated with capitalization.

More often, the prosody of pragmatic functions is in the form of prosodic constructions, combinations of multiple features: not only pitch, but also loudness, duration, timing, phonetic reduction, and voice qualities such as creaky and breathy voice. For example, the prosody of "awww", when used as an exclamation of praise for a cute baby, involves creaky nasal voice, high pitch that is generally flat except with small initial and final peaks, relatively loud volume, and extended duration.

The importance of non-pitch features can be seen in two uses of pitch downsteps. In one, the minor-third pattern, the downstep in pitch, prototypically about three semitones, is accompanied by lengthening, flatness of pitch, harmonicity, and other features. This combination serves purposes such as cuing and calling people, as when calling someone to dinner with dinner time!. Another construction also involves pitch downstep, but this one typically involves also nasality, low volume, and other features, and its function is to mark apologies as sincere.

== Paralinguistic and emotional prosody ==
In English, as in all languages, prosody is also used in conveying emotions. Some emotion-prosody mappings are nearly universal in nature, such as the expressions of pain, and others are more language-specific, such as the expressions of envy or remorse. Sociolinguistically, English prosody varies significantly across dialects, and prosody is important in constructing social identities, including gender identies and social roles. Prosody is also important in indicating personality and intersectional properties, such as charisma, and in other paralinguistic functions.

== Applications ==
Overall the study of prosody has lagged compared to other areas of linguistics. Within the study of English prosody, topics other than read speech and intonation have lagged. In any case, no comprehensive and complete description of English prosody is as yet available, which makes prosody a challenge for both learners and teachers of English.

== See also ==
- High rising terminal
- Prosodic unit
- Teaching prosody
