= Prosody (linguistics) =

Timing, rhythm, and intonation of speech

In linguistics, prosody (/ˈprɒsədi, ˈprɒz-/) is the study of those elements of speech, including intonation, stress, rhythm and loudness, that occur simultaneously with individual sound segments: vowels and consonants. Often, prosody specifically refers to such elements, known as suprasegmentals, when they extend across more than one segment.

Prosody reflects the nuanced emotional features of the speaker or of their utterances: their obvious or underlying emotional state, the form of utterance (statement, question, or command), the presence of irony or sarcasm, certain emphasis on words or morphemes, contrast, focus, and so on. Prosody displays elements of language that are not encoded by grammar, punctuation or choice of vocabulary.

== Attributes of prosody ==
In the study of prosodic aspects of speech, it is usual to distinguish between auditory measures (subjective impressions produced in the mind of the listener) and objective measures (physical properties of the sound wave and physiological characteristics of articulation that may be measured objectively). Auditory (subjective) and objective (acoustic and articulatory) measures of prosody do not correspond in a linear way. Most studies of prosody have been based on auditory analysis using auditory scales.

Auditorily, the major prosodic variables are:

- pitch of the voice (varying between low and high)
- length of sounds (varying between short and long)
- loudness, or prominence (varying between soft and loud)
- timbre or phonatory quality (quality of sound)

Acoustically, these prosodic variables correspond closely to:

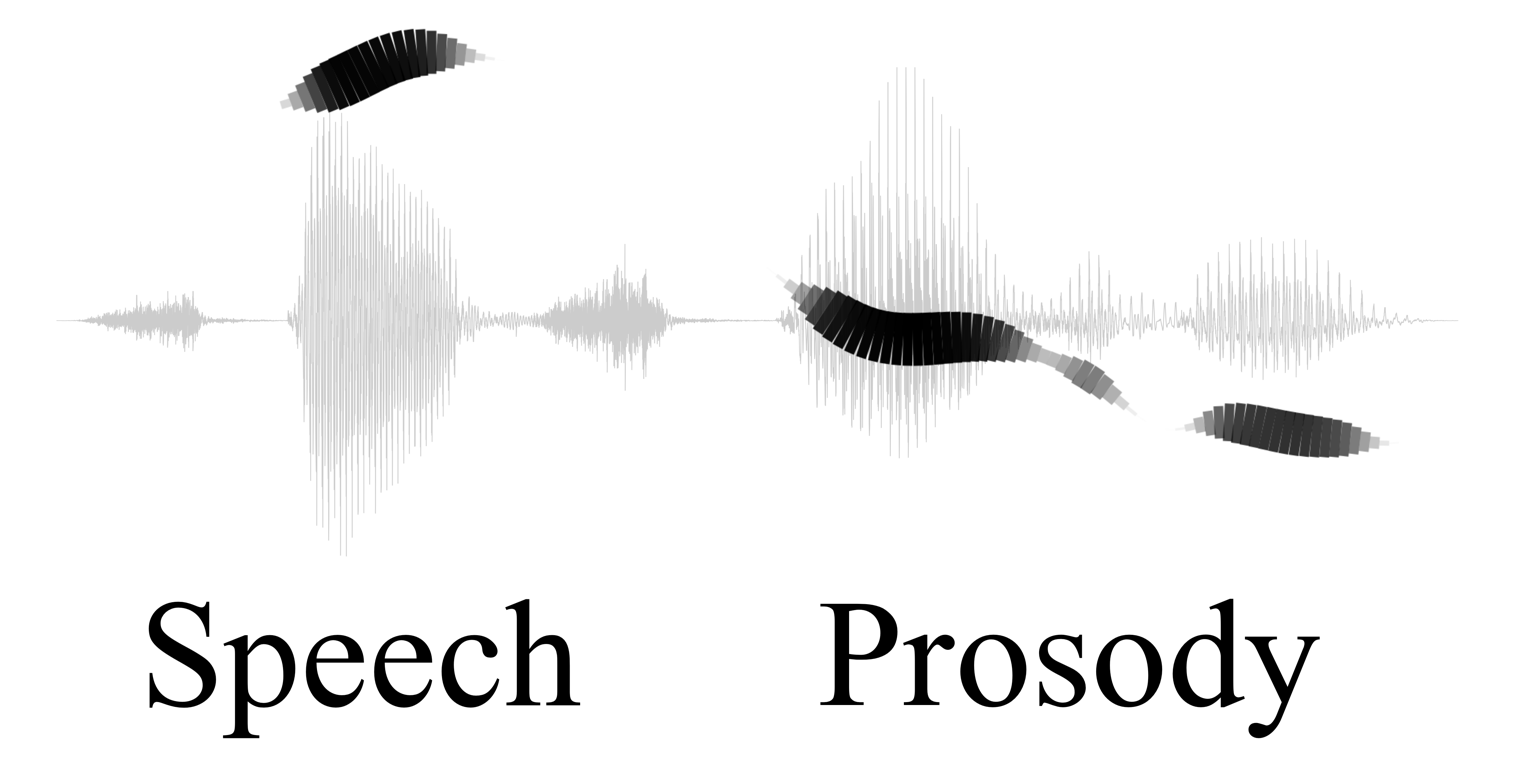
Visualization of the prosody of a male voice saying "speech prosody": pitch in ribbon height, and periodic energy in ribbon width and darkness.

Audio for the visualization above

- fundamental frequency (measured in hertz, or cycles per second)
- duration (measured in time units such as milliseconds or seconds)
- intensity, or sound pressure level (measured in decibels)
- spectral characteristics (distribution of energy at different parts of the audible frequency range)

Different combinations of these variables are exploited in the linguistic functions of intonation and stress, as well as other prosodic features such as rhythm and tempo. Additional prosodic variables have been studied, including voice quality and pausing. The behavior of the prosodic variables can be studied either as contours across the prosodic unit or by the behavior of boundaries.

== Phonology ==
Prosodic features are suprasegmental, since they are properties of units of speech that are defined over groups of sounds rather than single segments. When talking about prosodic features, it is important to distinguish between the personal characteristics that belong to an individual's voice (for example, their habitual pitch range, intonation patterns, etc.) and the independently variable prosodic features that are used contrastively to communicate meaning (for example, the use of changes in pitch to indicate the difference between statements and questions). Personal characteristics that belong to an individual are not linguistically significant while prosodic features are. Prosody has been found across all languages and is described to be a natural component of language. The defining features of prosody that display the nuanced emotions of an individual differ across languages and cultures.

=== Intonation ===
Some writers (e.g., O'Connor and Arnold) have described intonation entirely in terms of pitch, while others (e.g., Crystal) propose that "intonation" is a combination of several prosodic variables. English intonation is often said to be based on three aspects:

- The division of speech into units
- The highlighting of particular words and syllables
- The choice of pitch movement (e.g., fall or rise)

The choice of pitch movement and the highlighting of particular words to create different intonation patterns can be seen in the following English conversation:

"That's a cat?"
"Yup. That's a cat."
"A cat ? I thought it was a mountain lion!"

The exchange above is an example of using intonation to highlight particular words and to employ rising and falling of pitch to change meaning. If read out loud, the pitch of the voice moves in different directions on the word "cat." In the first line, pitch goes up, indicating a question. In the second line, pitch falls, indicating a statement— a confirmation of the first line in this case. Finally, in the third line, a complicated fall-rise pattern indicates incredulity. Each pitch/intonation pattern communicates a different meaning.

An additional pitch-related variation is pitch range; speakers are capable of speaking with a wide range of pitch (this is usually associated with excitement), while at other times with a narrow range. English makes use of changes in key; shifting one's intonation into the higher or lower part of one's pitch range is believed to be meaningful in certain contexts.

=== Stress ===
Stress functions as the means of making a syllable prominent. Stress may be studied in relation to individual words (named "word stress" or lexical stress) or in relation to larger units of speech (traditionally referred to as "sentence stress" but more appropriately named "prosodic stress"). Stressed syllables are made prominent by several variables. Stress is typically associated with the following:

- pitch prominence (a pitch level that is different from that of neighboring syllables, or a pitch movement)
- increased length (duration)
- increased loudness (dynamics)
- differences in timbre: in English and some other languages, stress is associated with aspects of vowel quality (whose acoustic correlate is the formant frequencies or spectrum of the vowel). Unstressed vowels tend to be centralized relative to stressed vowels, which are normally more peripheral in quality

Some of these cues are more powerful or prominent than others. Alan Cruttenden, for example, writes "Perceptual experiments have clearly shown that, in English at any rate, the three features (pitch, length and loudness) form a scale of importance in bringing syllables into prominence, pitch being the most efficacious, and loudness the least so".

When pitch prominence is the major factor, the resulting prominence is often called accent rather than stress.

There is considerable variation from language to language concerning the role of stress in identifying words or in interpreting grammar and syntax.

=== Rhythm ===
Although rhythm is not a prosodic variable in the way that pitch or loudness are, it is usual to treat a language's characteristic rhythm as a part of its prosodic phonology. It has often been asserted that languages exhibit regularity in the timing of successive units of speech, a regularity referred to as isochrony, and that every language may be assigned one of three rhythmical types: stress-timed (where the durations of the intervals between stressed syllables is relatively constant), syllable-timed (where the durations of successive syllables are relatively constant) and mora-timed (where the durations of successive morae are relatively constant). As explained in the isochrony article, this claim has not been supported by scientific evidence.

=== Pause ===
Voiced or unvoiced, the pause is a form of interruption to articulatory continuity such as an open or terminal juncture. Conversation analysis commonly notes pause length. Distinguishing auditory hesitation from silent pauses is one challenge. Contrasting junctures within and without word chunks can aid in identifying pauses.

There are a variety of "filled" pause types. Formulaic language pause fillers include "Like", "Er" and "Um", and paralinguistic expressive respiratory pauses include the sigh and gasp.

Although related to breathing, pauses may contain contrastive linguistic content, as in the periods between individual words in English advertising voice-over copy sometimes placed to denote high information content, e.g. "Quality. Service. Value".

=== Chunking ===
Pausing or its lack contributes to the perception of word groups, or chunks. Examples include the phrase, phraseme, constituent or interjection. Chunks commonly highlight lexical items or fixed expression idioms. Chunking prosody is present on any complete utterance and may correspond to a syntactic category, but not necessarily. The well-known English chunk "Know what I mean?" in common usage sounds like a single word ("No-wada-MEEN?") due to blurring or rushing the articulation of adjacent word syllables, thereby changing the potential open junctures between words into closed junctures.

== Functions ==
Prosody has had a number of perceptually significant functions in English and other languages, contributing to the recognition and comprehension of speech.

=== Grammar ===
It is believed that prosody assists listeners in parsing continuous speech and in the recognition of words, providing cues to syntactic structure, grammatical boundaries and sentence type. Boundaries between intonation units are often associated with grammatical or syntactic boundaries; these are marked by such prosodic features as pauses and slowing of tempo, as well as "pitch reset" where the speaker's pitch level returns to the level typical of the onset of a new intonation unit. In this way potential ambiguities may be resolved. For example, the sentence "They invited Bob and Bill and Al got rejected" is ambiguous when written, although addition of a written comma after either "Bob" or "Bill" will remove the sentence's ambiguity. But when the sentence is read aloud, prosodic cues like pauses (dividing the sentence into chunks) and changes in intonation will reduce or remove the ambiguity. Moving the intonational boundary in cases such as the above example will tend to change the interpretation of the sentence. This result has been found in studies performed in both English and Bulgarian. Research in English word recognition has demonstrated an important role for prosody.

=== Focus ===
Intonation and stress work together to highlight important words or syllables for contrast and focus. This is sometimes referred to as the accentual function of prosody. A well-known example is the ambiguous sentence "I never said she stole my money", where there are seven meaning changes depending on which of the seven words is vocally highlighted.

=== Discourse and pragmatic functions ===
Prosody helps convey many other pragmatic functions, including expressing attitudes (approval, uncertainty, dissatisfaction, and so on), flagging turn-taking intentions (to hold the floor, to yield the turn, to invite a backchannel like uh-huh, and so on), and marking topic structure (starting a new topic, closing a topic, interpolating a parenthetical remark, and so on), among others. For example, David Brazil and his associates studied how intonation can indicate whether information is new or already established; whether a speaker is dominant or not in a conversation; and when a speaker is inviting the listener to make a contribution to the conversation.

=== Emotion ===
Prosody is also important in signalling emotions and attitudes. When this is involuntary (as when the voice is affected by anxiety or fear), the prosodic information is not linguistically significant. However, when the speaker varies their speech intentionally, for example to indicate sarcasm, this usually involves the use of prosodic features. The most useful prosodic feature in detecting sarcasm is a reduction in the mean fundamental frequency relative to other speech for humor, neutrality, or sincerity. While prosodic cues are important in indicating sarcasm, context clues and shared knowledge are also important.

Emotional prosody was considered by Charles Darwin in The Descent of Man to predate the evolution of human language: "Even monkeys express strong feelings in different tones – anger and impatience by low, – fear and pain by high notes." Native speakers listening to actors reading emotionally neutral text while projecting emotions correctly recognized happiness 62% of the time, anger 95%, surprise 91%, sadness 81%, and neutral tone 76%. When a database of this speech was processed by computer, segmental features allowed better than 90% recognition of happiness and anger, while suprasegmental prosodic features allowed only 44%–49% recognition. The reverse was true for surprise, which was recognized only 69% of the time by segmental features and 96% of the time by suprasegmental prosody. In typical conversation (no actor voice involved), the recognition of emotion may be quite low, of the order of 50%, hampering the complex interrelationship function of speech advocated by some authors. However, even if emotional expression through prosody cannot always be consciously recognized, tone of voice may continue to have subconscious effects in conversation. This sort of expression stems not from linguistic or semantic effects, and can thus be isolated from traditional linguistic content. Aptitude of the average person to decode conversational implicature of emotional prosody has been found to be slightly less accurate than traditional facial expression discrimination ability; however, specific ability to decode varies by emotion. These emotional have been determined to be ubiquitous across cultures, as they are utilized and understood across cultures. Various emotions, and their general experimental identification rates, are as follows:

- Anger and sadness: High rate of accurate identification
- Fear and happiness: Medium rate of accurate identification
- Disgust: Poor rate of accurate identification

The prosody of an utterance is used by listeners to guide decisions about the emotional affect of the situation. Whether a person decodes the prosody as positive, negative, or neutral plays a role in the way a person decodes a facial expression accompanying an utterance. As the facial expression becomes closer to neutral, the prosodic interpretation influences the interpretation of the facial expression. A study by Marc D. Pell revealed that 600 ms of prosodic information is necessary for listeners to be able to identify the affective tone of the utterance. At lengths below this, there was not enough information for listeners to process the emotional context of the utterance.

== Cognitive, neural, developmental, and clinical aspects ==
=== Child language ===
Unique prosodic features have been noted in infant-directed speech (IDS) - also known as baby talk, child-directed speech (CDS), or "motherese". Adults, especially caregivers, speaking to young children tend to imitate childlike speech by using higher and more variable pitch, as well as an exaggerated stress. These prosodic characteristics are thought to assist children in acquiring phonemes, segmenting words, and recognizing phrasal boundaries. And though there is no evidence to indicate that infant-directed speech is necessary for language acquisition, these specific prosodic features have been observed in many different languages.

=== Aprosodia ===
An aprosodia is an acquired or developmental impairment in comprehending or generating the emotion conveyed in spoken language. Aprosody is often accompanied by the inability to properly utilize variations in speech, particularly with deficits in the ability to accurately modulate pitch, loudness, intonation, and rhythm of word formation. This is seen sometimes in autistic individuals.

The three main types of aprosodia are:

- Lexical prosody: aprosodia affecting certain stressed syllables. Studies have shown that in the brain, lexical-tone contrast evokes a stronger pre-attentive response in the right hemisphere than in the left hemisphere. With consonant contrast, the brain produced an opposite pattern, with a stronger pre-attentive response in the left hemisphere than in the right hemisphere. An example of lexical prosody would be "CONvert" versus "conVERT".
- Phrasal prosody: aprosodia affecting certain stressed words. Deficits in the left hemisphere affect this linguistic rule. An example of phrasal prosody would be a "Hot DOG", a dog that's hot, versus a "HOT dog", a frankfurter.
- Clausal prosody: aprosodia affecting contrastive, emphatic, and focal stress. Deficits in the left hemisphere affect this linguistic rule. An example of clausal prosody would be, "the horses were racing from the BARN" versus "the HORSES were racing from the barn."

==== Lexical prosody ====
Lexical prosody refers to the specific amplitudes, pitches, or lengths of vowels that are applied to specific syllables in words based on what the speaker wants to emphasize. The different stressors placed on individual syllables can change entire meanings of a word. Take one popular English word for example:

- CONvert (noun: someone who has changed beliefs)
- conVERT (verb: the act of changing)

In English, lexical prosody is used for a few different reasons. As we have seen above, lexical prosody was used to change the form of a word from a noun to a verb. Another function of lexical prosody has to do with the grammatical role that a word plays within a sentence. Adjectives and nouns of a sentence are often stressed on the first syllables while verbs are often stressed on the second syllable. For example:

- "Elizabeth felt an increase in her happiness after meeting Tom"

Here, adults will emphasize the first syllable, "IN", as "increase" functions as a noun.

- "Tom will increase his workload"

Here, adults will emphasize the second syllable, "CREASE", as "increase" functions as a verb.

Another way that lexical prosody is used in the English language is in compound nouns such as "wishbone, mailbox, and blackbird" where the first stem is emphasized. Some suffixes can also affect the ways in which different words are stressed. Take "active" for example. Without the suffix, the lexical emphasis is on "AC". However, when we add the suffix -ity, the stress shifts to "TIV".

==== Phrasal prosody ====
Phrasal prosody refers to the rhythm and tempo of phrases, often in an artistic setting such as music or poetry, but not always. The rhythm of the English language has four different elements: stress, time, pause, and pitch. Furthermore, "When stress is the basis of the metric pattern, we have poetry; when pitch is the pattern basis, we have rhythmic prose" (Weeks 11). Stress retraction is a popular example of phrasal prosody in everyday life. For example:

- After eating sevenTEEN, PICKLES did not scare him
- After eating SEVENteen PICKLES, he was afraid

Contrastive stress is another everyday English example of phrasal prosody that helps us determine what parts of the sentence are important. Take these sentences for example:

- A man went up the STAIRS

Emphasizing that the STAIRS is how the man went up.

- A MAN went up the stairs

Emphasizing that it was a MAN who went up the stairs.

It's important to note that the right hemisphere of the brain dominates one's perception of prosody. In contrast to left hemisphere damage where patterns of aphasias are present, patterns of aprosodias are present with damage to the left hemisphere. In patients with right hemisphere lesions, they are characterized as monotonous and as lacking variety in their tone and expression. They're also seen to struggle with the identification and discrimination of semantically neutral sentences with varying tones of happiness, sadness, anger, and indifference, exemplifying the importance of prosody in language comprehension and production.

=== Brain regions involved ===
Producing these nonverbal elements requires intact motor areas of the face, mouth, tongue, and throat. This area is associated with Brodmann areas 44 and 45 (Broca's area) of the left frontal lobe. Damage to areas 44/45, specifically on the right hemisphere, produces motor aprosodia, with the nonverbal elements of speech being disturbed (facial expression, tone, rhythm of voice).

Understanding these nonverbal elements requires an intact and properly functioning right-hemisphere perisylvian area, particularly Brodmann area 22 (not to be confused with the corresponding area in the left hemisphere, which contains Wernicke's area). Damage to the right inferior frontal gyrus causes a diminished ability to convey emotion or emphasis by voice or gesture, and damage to right superior temporal gyrus causes problems comprehending emotion or emphasis in the voice or gestures of others. The right Brodmann area 22 aids in the interpretation of prosody, and damage causes sensory aprosodia, with the patient unable to comprehend changes in voice and body language.

== See also ==
- English prosody
- Paralanguage
- Phonological hierarchy
- Prosodic construction
- Prosodic unit
- Prosody (poetry)
- Semantic prosody, or discourse prosody
- Teaching prosody
