= Charles Hampden-Turner =

British management philosopher (1934–2026)

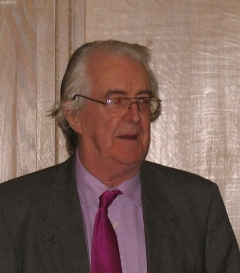
Charles Hampden-Turner

Charles Hampden-Turner (29 September 1934 – 13 September 2026) was a British management philosopher and academic, who was Senior Research Associate at the Judge Business School at the University of Cambridge since 1990. He was the creator of Dilemma Theory and co-founder (with Fons Trompenaars) of the Trompenaars-Hampden-Turner Group based in Amsterdam.

== Life and career ==
Hampden-Turner was born in London on 29 September 1934. He grew up in Cambridge, in a house on the site where Robinson College now stands. He was educated at Wellington College, a military public school attended by his father, and undertook his national service with the same regiment his father had served in, the Suffolk Regiment.

On finishing military service, Hampden-Turner attended Trinity College, Cambridge. He spoke often in the Cambridge Union Society and was elected Chairman of the Cambridge University Conservative Association. During the 1980s he worked as a senior research fellow at the London Business School and was a visiting scholar at Massachusetts Institute of Technology.

Hampden-Turner died on 13 September 2026, at the age of 91.

== Publications ==
Books/Monographs

- 1970, Radical man. London: Duckworth.
- 1974, From Poverty to Dignity: a strategy for poor Americans. Garden City: New York.
- 1976, Sane Asylum: Inside the Delancey Street Foundation. San Francisco Book Company: San Francisco.
- 1981, Maps of the Mind: Charts and concepts of the mind and its labyrinths. Macmillan Publishing Company: New York.
- 1983, Gentlemen and tradesmen: the values of economic catastrophe. London: Routledge/Kegan Paul.
- 1990, Charting the corporate mind: from dilemma to strategy. Oxford: Basil Blackwell.
- 1990, L'enterprise face a ses valeurs: cartographier les tensions et developer la synergie. Paris: Les Editions d'Organisation.
- 1993, with Fons Trompenaars, The seven cultures of capitalism: value, systems for creating wealth in the United States, Britain, Japan, Germany, France, Sweden, and the Netherlands. London: Piatkus.
- 1994, Corporate culture: how to generate organisational strength and lasting commercial advantage. London: Piatkus.
- 1997, with Fons Trompenaars, Mastering the infinite game: how East Asian values are transforming business practices. Oxford: Capstone.
- 1997, with Fons Trompenaars, Riding the waves of culture: understanding cultural diversity in business. London: Nicholas Brealey.
- 2000, with Fons Trompenaars, Building cross-cultural competence: how to create wealth from conflicting values. Chichester: Wiley.
- 2001, with Fons Trompenaars, 21 leaders for the 21st century: how innovative leaders manage in the digital age. Oxford: Capstone.
- 2004, with Fons Trompenaars, Managing people across cultures. Chichester: Capstone.
- 2005, with B. Groen, The Titans of Saturn: leadership and performance lessons from the Cassini-Huygens mission. Singapore and London: Marshall Cavendish Business and Cyan Communications Ltd.
- 2015, with (Fons Trompenaars/ Tom Cummings), Nine Visions of Capitalism, Oxford: Infinite Ideas Ltd.

Book chapters

- 1992, "Foreword." In Common, R., Flynn, N. and Mellon, E. (eds.): Managing public services: competition and decentralization. Oxford: Butterworth-Heinemann, pp.vii-x.
- 1993, "Dilemmas of strategic learning loops." In Hendry, J. and Johnson, G., with Newton, J. (eds.): Strategic thinking: leadership and the management of change. Chichester: Wiley, pp. 327–346.
- 1994, "Foreword." In Huffington, C. and Brunning, H. (eds.): Internal consultancy in the public sector: case studies. London: Karnac Books, pp.xiii-xv.
- 1994, "Foreword." In McCaughan, N. and Palmer, B.: Systems thinking for harassed managers. London: Karnac Books, pp.xiii-xvii.
- 1996, "Strategic dilemmas occasioned by using alternative scenarios of the future." In Garratt, B. (ed.): Developing strategic thought: rediscovering the art of direction-giving. London: McGraw-Hill, pp. 99–138.
- 1996, "Mintzberg, Henry (1939-).", "Morgan, Gareth (1943-).", "Reich, Robert M. (1946-)." & "Schon, Donald (1930-)." In Warner, M. (ed.): International encyclopedia of business and management. London: Routledge, 1st edition, pp. 3492–3495.
- 1996, "A world turned upside-down: doing business in Asia", in Joynt, P. and Warner, M. (eds.) Managing across cultures: issues and perspectives. London: International Thomson Business Press, 1st edition, pp. 275–305.
- 1996, "Designing the infinite game: the forty-fifth International Design Conference in Aspen." In Kao, J. (ed.), The new business of design, New York: Allworth, pp. 207–221.
- 1997, "Mintzberg, Henry (1939-)." In Sorge, A. and Warner, M. (eds.): The IEBM handbook of organizational behaviour. London: International Thomson Business Press, pp. 661–664.
- 1997, "Masters of the infinite game." In Mulgan, G. (ed.): Life after politics. London: Harper Collins, pp. 361–368.
- 1998, "Reich, Robert M. (1946-)."' "Mintzberg, Henry (1939-).", "Schon, Donald (1930-).", "Morgan, Gareth (1943-).", "Reich, Robert M. (1946-)." & "McGregor, Douglas (1906-64)." in Warner, M. (ed.): The IEBM handbook of management thinking. London: International Thomson Business Press, pp. 466–469.
- 2000, "Perspectives on management in the Americas", in Warner, M. (ed.): Regional encyclopedia of business and management: vol.1: Management in the Americas. London: Thomson Learning, pp. 94–108.
- 2002, "A mirror-image world: doing business in Asia." In Warner, M. and Joynt, P. (eds.): Managing across cultures: issues and perspectives. London: Thomson Learning, 2nd edition, pp. 143–167.
- 2003, "Culture and management in Singapore." In Warner, M. (ed.): Culture and management in Asia. London: RoutledgeCurzon, pp. 171–186.
- 2012, Cross-cultural management textbook: Lessons from the world leading experts, Introduction by Edgar H. Schein with Fons Trompenaars, Meredith Belbin, Jerome Dumetz, Juliette Tournand, Peter Woolliams, Olga Saginova, Stephen M. R. Covey, Dean Foster, Craig Storti, Joerg Schmitz
