= Cultural sensitivity =

Knowledge, awareness, and acceptance of other cultures

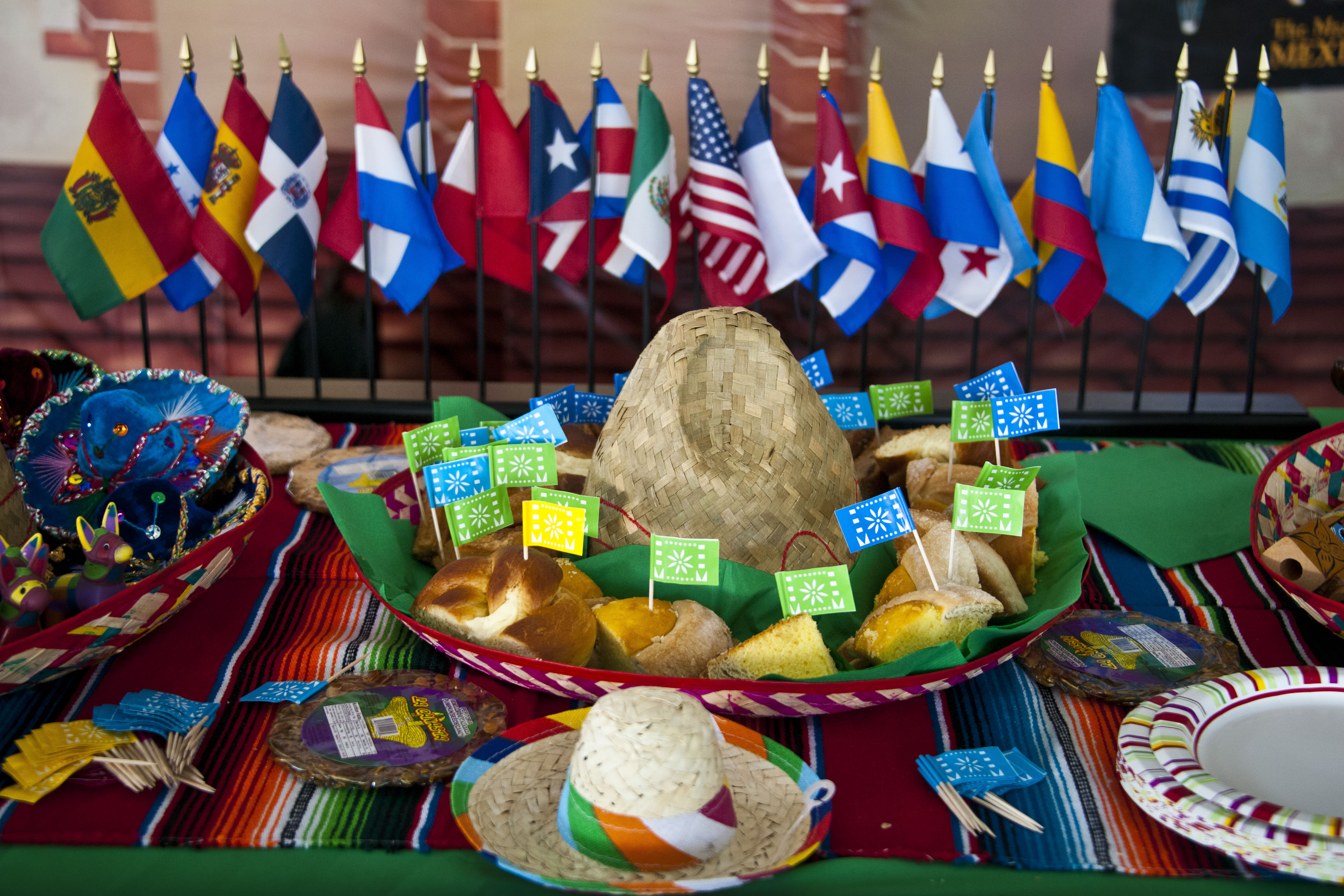
Cultural Awareness Day at Maxwell Air Force Base in Montgomery, Alabama (2014)

Cultural sensitivity, also referred to as cross-cultural sensitivity or cultural awareness, is the knowledge and awareness of other cultures and others' cultural identities. It is related to cultural competence (the skills needed for effective communication with people of other cultures, which includes cross-cultural competence), and is sometimes regarded as the precursor to the achievement of cultural competence, but is a more commonly used term. On the individual level, cultural sensitivity is a state of mind regarding interactions with those different from oneself. Cultural sensitivity enables travelers, workers, and others to successfully navigate interactions with a culture other than their own.

Cultural diversity includes demographic factors (such as race, gender, and age) as well as values and cultural norms. Cultural sensitivity counters ethnocentrism, and involves intercultural communication, among relative skills. Most countries' populations include minority groups comprising indigenous peoples, subcultures, and immigrants who approach life from a different perspective and mindset than that of the dominant culture. Workplaces, educational institutions, media, and organizations of all types are becoming more mindful of being culturally sensitive to all stakeholders and the population at large. Increasingly, training of cultural sensitivity is being incorporated into workplaces and students' curricula at all levels. The training is usually aimed at the dominant culture, but in multicultural societies may also be taught to migrants to teach them about other minority groups. The concept is also taught to expatriates working in other countries to ingratiate them into other customs and traditions.

== Definitions and aims ==
There are a variety of definitions surrounding cultural sensitivity. All of these definitions revolve around the idea that it is the knowledge, awareness, and acceptance of other cultures. It includes "the willingness, ability and sensitivity required to understand people with different backgrounds", and the acceptance of diversity. Crucially, it "refers to being aware that cultural differences and similarities between people exist without assigning them a value." Definitions also include the skill set acquired by this learning. Cultural awareness is having the knowledge of the existence of multiple different cultures with different attitudes and worldviews, while cultural sensitivity means the acceptance of those differences and accepting that one's own culture is not superior.

In 2008, cultural sensitivity was found to be a widely used term in a literature search of global databases, both popular and scholarly. Based on this literature, cultural sensitivity is defined as "employing one's knowledge, consideration, understanding, [and] respect, and tailoring [it] after realizing awareness of self and others, and encountering a diverse group or individual".

There are many different types of cultural diversity in any society, including factors such as marginalized or socially excluded groups; ethnicity; sexual orientation; disability; values and cultural norms. Cultural sensitivity is relevant to all of these.

Support of cultural sensitivity is based on ideological or practical considerations. Former Secretary-General of the United Nations, Kofi Annan, advocated cultural sensitivity as an essential value in the modern world:

Tolerance, inter-cultural dialogue and respect for diversity are more essential than ever in a world where people are becoming more and more closely interconnected.

== Factors for cultural awareness ==
Certain factors that affect cultural sensitivity include religion, ethnicity, race, national origin, language, or gender. Others areas to look at include age, education, socio-economic status, sexual orientation, and mental/physical challenges.

=== Cultural competence ===
Awareness and understanding of other cultures is a key factor of cultural sensitivity. Cultural Competence relies on the ability of both parties involved to have a pleasant and successful interaction. The term "cultural competence" is often used to describe those skills acquired to embody cultural sensitivity, particularly in the workplace. Cultural sensitivity requires flexibility. Louise Rasmussen and Winston Sieck led studies consisting of members of the U.S. Military that identified 12 Core Aspects (consisting of four subgroups) of successful cross-cultural interactions. These aspects rely on the subjects of the study being able to remain diplomatic and learn from intercultural interactions.

The 12 Core Aspects Include:

1. A diplomatic stance
  1. Maintaining a Mission Orientation
  2. Understanding Self in Social Context
  3. Managing Attitude Towards Culture
2. Cultural Learning
  1. Self-Directed Learning of Cultures
  2. Developing Reliable Information Sources
  3. Learning New Cultures Efficiently
3. Cultural Reasoning
  1. Coping with Cultural Surprises
  2. Developing Cultural Explanations of Behavior
  3. Cultural Perspective Taking
4. Intercultural Interaction
  1. Intercultural Communication Planning
  2. Disciplined Self Presentation
  3. Reflection and Feedback

== In the dominant culture ==
Cultural awareness and sensitivity help to overcome inherent ethnocentrism by learning about other cultures and how various modes and expectations may differ between those cultures. These differences range from ethical, religious, and social attitudes to body language and other nonverbal communication. Cultural sensitivity is just one dimension of cultural competence, and has an impact on ethnocentrism and other factors related to culture. The results of developing cultural sensitivity are considered positive: communication is improved, leading to more effective interaction between the people concerned, and improved outcome or interventions for the client or customer.

The concept is taught in many workplaces, as it is an essential skill for managing and building teams in a multicultural society. Intercultural communication has been cited as one of the two biggest challenges within the workplace, along with internal communications (mission statement, meetings, etc.).

=== In healthcare ===
Cultural sensitivity training in health care providers can improve the satisfaction and health outcomes of patients from different minority groups. Because standard measures for diagnosis and prognosis relate to established norms, cultural sensitivity is essential. A person's norms are defined by their culture, and these may differ significantly from the treating medical professional. Language barriers, beliefs, and trust are just a few of the factors to consider when treating patients of other cultural groups. Understanding cultural beliefs regarding health and care can give healthcare professionals a better idea of how to proceed with providing care.

It is important to understand the concept behind the buzzword in the healthcare setting, as cultural sensitivity can increase nurses' appreciation of and communication with other professionals as well as patients. Part of providing culturally sensitive care is to develop cultural competence as an ongoing process. Nurses and employers should be committed to educating themselves about different patients' beliefs, values, and perspectives.

=== In therapy ===
In a study on narrative theory in therapy, Cynthia C. Morris concluded that culture in made up of the collected stories of a group of people. In the practice of therapy, understanding a patient's point of view is vital to the clinician. Cultural Sensitivity allows for a clinician to get a more well-rounded understanding of where the client is coming from, why they may think about things in a certain way, or their approach to thought in general. Culturally Sensitive Therapy approaches psychotherapy by emphasizing how the clinician understands the client's race, ethnicity, sexual orientation, gender, religion and any other aspects that relate to culture and identity. Culturally sensitive therapists will help their patients feel more seen and understood, while those without cultural sensitivity may turn away patients from the practice of therapy altogether.

== Working and travelling abroad ==
On the individual level, cultural sensitivity allows travelers and expatriate workers to successfully navigate a different culture with which they are interacting. It can increase the security of travelers because it helps them understand interactions from the perspective of the native culture. One individual's understanding of another's culture can increase respect for the other individual, allowing for more effective communication and interactions. For managers as well as employees, cultural sensitivity is increasingly more vital in business or government jobs.

This cross-cultural sensitivity can lead to both competitiveness and success when working with or within organizations located in a different country. These benefits highlight the consideration of how two societies and cultures operate, particularly with respect to how they are similar and different from each other. Being able to determine these in terms of thoughts, behavior beliefs, and expressions among others makes it possible to solve problems meaningfully and act in a manner that is acceptable to all stakeholders.

Lacking awareness of foreign cultures can also have adverse consequences. These can be as severe as reaching the point of legal action. Similarly, certain etiquettes in one country can be considered violations of business codes in another.

=== Tourism ===
Tourism is a major opportunity to experience and interact with other cultures. It is therefore one of the most vital times to be culturally sensitive. There are major faux pas to be aware of regarding the locals. Ensuring awareness of table manners, common phrases, local dress, etiquette at holy sites, and other immersions into the culture are great ways to be sensitive to the destination and engage with it.

Tourism to areas with Indigenous people requires more awareness and cultural sensitivity. Many of these areas have been colonized and turned into tourist attractions that put on display the culture that is being erased. These kinds of attractions lead to stereotyping that negatively impacts the culture rather than exposing others to it. These displays can often turn the culture into an exotic aesthetic that leads to inauthentic portrayals of the culture and furthers stereotypes. This cultural insensitivity happens when cultural practices and products are sold by another cultural group without consent. Due to this, culturally sensitive tourism is an up and coming industry that aims to engage with a culture rather than exoticized.

== Models ==
=== Bennett scale ===
Milton Bennett was the first to create a model or framework designed to help comprehension of various stages of intercultural sensitivity. This became known as the Developmental Model of Intercultural Sensitivity (DMIS), otherwise referred to as the Bennett scale. This scale has been adapting and developing since 1986 and is included in The International Encyclopedia of Intercultural Communication (2017).

Bennett developed the framework of the model to show the intercultural sensitivity a person may experience. Intercultural sensitivity is defined as an individual's ability to develop emotion towards understanding and appreciating cultural differences that promotes appropriate and effective behavior in intercultural communication"

According to Bennett, "As one's perceptual organization of cultural difference becomes more complex, one's experience of culture becomes more sophisticated and the potential for exercising competence in intercultural relations increases." By recognizing how cultural difference is being experienced, predictions about the effectiveness of intercultural communication can be made.

Bennett describes a continuum, which moves from ethnocentrism to "ethnorelativism". The model includes six stages of experiencing difference.

The six stages explained in the model include:

- Denial - when people fail to recognize distinctions among cultures or consider them to be irrelevant
- Defense - people perceive other cultures in a competitive way, or in an us-against-them way
- Minimization - people assume that their distinct cultural worldview is shared by others, or when they perceive their culture's values as fundamental or universal human values that apply to everyone.
- Acceptance - recognize that different beliefs and values are shaped by culture,
- Adaptation - when people are able to adopt the perspective of another culture,
- Integration - someone's identity or sense of self evolves to incorporate the values, beliefs, perspectives, and behaviors of other cultures.

=== Community Tool Box ===
The Community Tool Box was developed by the University of Kansas' Center for Community Health and Development, a designated World Health Organization Collaborating Centre for Community Health and Development. The Centre's idea of "Building Culturally Competent Organizations," is a guide for diversity and inclusion training in the workplace. The Tool Box refers to three levels leading up to the fourth, the end goal:

1. cultural knowledge
2. cultural awareness
3. cultural sensitivity
4. cultural competence

Each step builds on the previous one, with the final one, cultural competence, being the stage where the organization has effectively enabled better outcomes in a multicultural workforce.

== Competence training ==
Training to achieve cultural competence or cultural sensitivity is undertaken in schools, workplaces, in healthcare settings

== See also ==
- Cross-cultural communication
- Cultural assimilation
- Cultural behavior
- Cultural diversity
- Cultural identity
- Cultural intelligence
- Cultural pluralism
- Cultural relativism
- Intercultural learning
- Intercultural therapy
- Multiculturalism
- Social identity
