= Right Between the Ears =

American comical radio show

Right Between The Ears (RBTE) was a Kansas-based comical radio show broadcast nationally in the United States.

== History ==
The show was created in 1985 by producer-writer Darrell Brogdon. The show was first known as The Imagination Workshop and presented relatively straightforward radio dramas. Beginning the late 1980s, however, full-length radio plays were de-emphasized in favor of Saturday Night Live-style comedy sketches, and by 1990 the show became an all-comedy offering, broadcast regularly over KANU-FM, the NPR station licensed to the University of Kansas in Lawrence.

Between 1993 and 2000, episodes of The Imagination Workshop were distributed to public radio stations across the country by National Public Radio. During this time, the show was heard on approximately 200 public radio stations, as well as on BBC Radio Four. In 1999, The Imagination Workshop was featured on TV's 60 Minutes, in a piece by Morley Safer on the proposed de-funding of the Corporation for Public Broadcasting.

The show's name was changed to Right Between the Ears in 2000. In 2001, RBTE was featured in its own weekly series on public TV stations. Since 2004, the series has been aired weekly on Sirius Satellite Radio, beginning on the Raw Dog Channel. More recently, episodes of Right Between the Ears have aired Saturdays at 8:00pm Eastern on the Sirius Laugh Break channel. In addition, the weekly show airs on the Kansas Public Radio network, and on KCMO AM-710 in Kansas City, Missouri. RBTE celebrated 20 years on the air with a live broadcast from Kansas City's historic Folly Theatre in September 2005.

The last episode was recorded in 2017.

== Cast members ==
The cast of Right Between the Ears includes David Greusel, John Jessup, David Martin, Andi Meyer, Jim Moore, Kip Niven, Roberta Solomon, Rick Tamblyn and Teri Wilder. Sound effects for the live performances are created by Mary Ellen Kriegh. Production engineers are Jason Slote and Chubias Smith. Producer and principal writer is Darrell Brogdon.

== Awards ==
- 2007 - Silver World Medal, Best Regularly Scheduled Comedy Show, The New York Festivals
- 2006 - Silver World Medal, Best Regularly Scheduled Comedy Show, The New York Festivals
- 2005 - Crystal Award of Excellence, Best Writing/Humor, Communicator Awards
- 2005 - Crystal Award of Excellence, Best Radio Program/Live Broadcast, Communicator Awards
- 2005 - Gold World Medal, Best Regularly Scheduled Comedy Show, The New York Festivals
- 2005 - Gold World Medal, Best Writing, The New York Festivals
- 2005 - Crystal Award of Excellence, Best Writing/Humor, Communicator Awards
- 2005 - Crystal Award of Excellence, Creativity/On-Air Talent/Humor, Communicator Awards
- 2005 - Crystal Award of Excellence, Best Writing/Humor, Communicator Awards
- 2005 - Crystal Award of Excellence, Creativity/On-Air Talent/Acting, Communicator Awards
- 2005 - Crystal Award of Excellence, Best Radio Program/Live Broadcast, Communicator Awards
- 2004 - National Best of Show, Silver Microphone Awards
- 2004 - Festival Grand Prize, The New York Festivals
- 2004 - Gold World Medal, Best Regularly-Scheduled Comedy Show, The New York Festivals
- 2004 - Gold World Medal, Best Humor/On-Air Personality, The New York Festivals
- 2003 - Golden Reel, Best Music/Entertainment Show, National Federation of Community Broadcasters
- 2003 - Gold World Medal, Best Humor/On-Air Personality, The New York Festivals
- 2002 - Best Audio Program/Entertainment, Silver Microphone Awards
- 2000 - Gold World Medal, Best Writing, The New York Festivals
- 2000 - Best Audio Program/Entertainment, Silver Microphone Awards
- 1993 - Festival Grand Prize, The New York Festivals
- 1993 - Gold World Medal, Best Regularly-Scheduled Comedy Show, The New York Festivals
- 1993 - CPB Program Award, Best Live Entertainment Show, Corporation for Public Broadcasting
- 1991 - CPB Program Award, Best Live Entertainment Show, Corporation for Public Broadcasting
- 1991 - CPB Program Award, Outstanding Technical Achievement, Corporation for Public Broadcasting
- 1990 - CPB Program Award, Best Live Entertainment, Corporation for Public Broadcasting
