= Ship for World Youth Program =

Youth exchange program run by Japan

The Ship for World Youth (SWY) Program is an international youth exchange initiative, consisting in bringing a group of youth together to sail for eight weeks. It was designed to foster cross-cultural understanding and global cooperation and their understanding of local cultures.

== History ==
In 1959, the precursor to the Ship for World Youth Program, the Japanese Youth Goodwill Mission Program, was launched to commemorate the marriage of then-Crown Prince Akihito. This marked the beginning of Japan's international youth exchange initiatives by the Cabinet Office. In 1967, the Japanese Youth Goodwill Cruise Program started as a centennial celebration of the Meiji Restoration. In 1988, this program was reorganized into the Ship for World Youth (SWY) Program, launching its first voyage in 1989 and shifting the focus toward more multilateral and intercultural exchange. The program exemplifies the development of seafaring as youth education and diplomacy programs.

== Program structure ==
The program is open to young people aged between 18 and 30. Each year it involves 200 participants from Japan and invited countries. Selected Japanese and foreign young adults live together aboard a ship, participating in seminars and discussions on global issues. Participants also visit local institutions, meet local people in the ports of call, and attend official events with Japanese officials.

== Past programs ==
In 2021, the program was conducted as an online program due to the COVID-19 pandemic.

Past programs
Fiscal Year	Main Destinations / Ports of Call	Participants
2024	Japan	186
2023	Japan	223
2022	Japan	143
2021	Online program	76
2019	Mexico	227
2018	Japan, Australia	239
2017	India, Sri Lanka	242
2016	New Zealand, Fiji	234
2015	India, Sri Lanka	233
2014	Japan	204
2013	Japan	158
2012	Japan	211
2011	India, Sri Lanka	260
2010	Fiji, Australia	262
2009	UAE, India	268
2008	Tonga, New Zealand	246
2007	Oman, India	250
2006	Australia, New Zealand	252
2005	India, Kenya, Mauritius	250
2004	Australia, New Zealand, Fiji	260
2003	India, Tanzania, Seychelles	258
2002	Australia, USA, Canada	247
2001	Fiji, New Zealand, Singapore, Thailand	258
2000	Russia, USA, Tonga, New Zealand	252
1999	Seychelles, South Africa, Tanzania, UAE	263
1998	Solomon Islands, Tonga, Ecuador, Mexico	271
1997	Seychelles, Kenya, Jordan, Oman	294
1996	New Zealand, Chile, Costa Rica, Mexico	303
1995	Sri Lanka, South Africa, Tanzania, UAE	278
1994	Australia, Ecuador, Fiji, Mexico	291
1993	Greece, India, Kenya, Sri Lanka	275
1992	Costa Rica, Dominican Republic, USA, Venezuela	278
1991	Sri Lanka, Egypt, Spain, Oman	268
1990	Mexico, USA, Venezuela, Costa Rica	274
1989	India, Egypt, Greece, Oman	268
1988	USA, Mexico, Venezuela, Ecuador	276

== Impact ==
Former participants established national alumni associations in their respective countries. These are coordinated internationally through the Ship for World Youth Alumni Association, which also organizes the SWYAA Global Assembly, a yearly conference hosted in one of the participating countries.

The program has been studied by researchers of intercultural communication and adaptation. Studies have criticized the uncritical use of English in this program, or found that Japanese participants exhibited higher levels of stress but that stress generally subsided during travel. Another study reports improvements in intercultural sensitivity as defined by the Developmental Model of Intercultural Sensitivity.

It is also credited for having inspired other educational programs internationally.
