= Kansas Crew =

American rowing club

- Founded: 1977; 49 years ago
- University: University of Kansas
- Athletic director: Travis Goff
- Head coach: Jessica Sadler
- Conference: Big 12
- Location: Lawrence, Kansas
- Facility: University of Kansas Boathouse
- Area of Practice: Kansas River
- Nickname: KU Crew

Kansas Crew is the co-ed college rowing club for the University of Kansas in Lawrence, Kansas. The club is located on a 5,000 meter stretch of the Kansas River. Kansas Crew was established in 1977.

The team is coached by Jessica Sadler. Notable alumni of the team include national team rowers Rob Zechmann, David Gabel, and Jenn Jewett. The team shares facilities with the University of Kansas women's Division I rowing team at Burcham Park in Lawrence, Kansas.

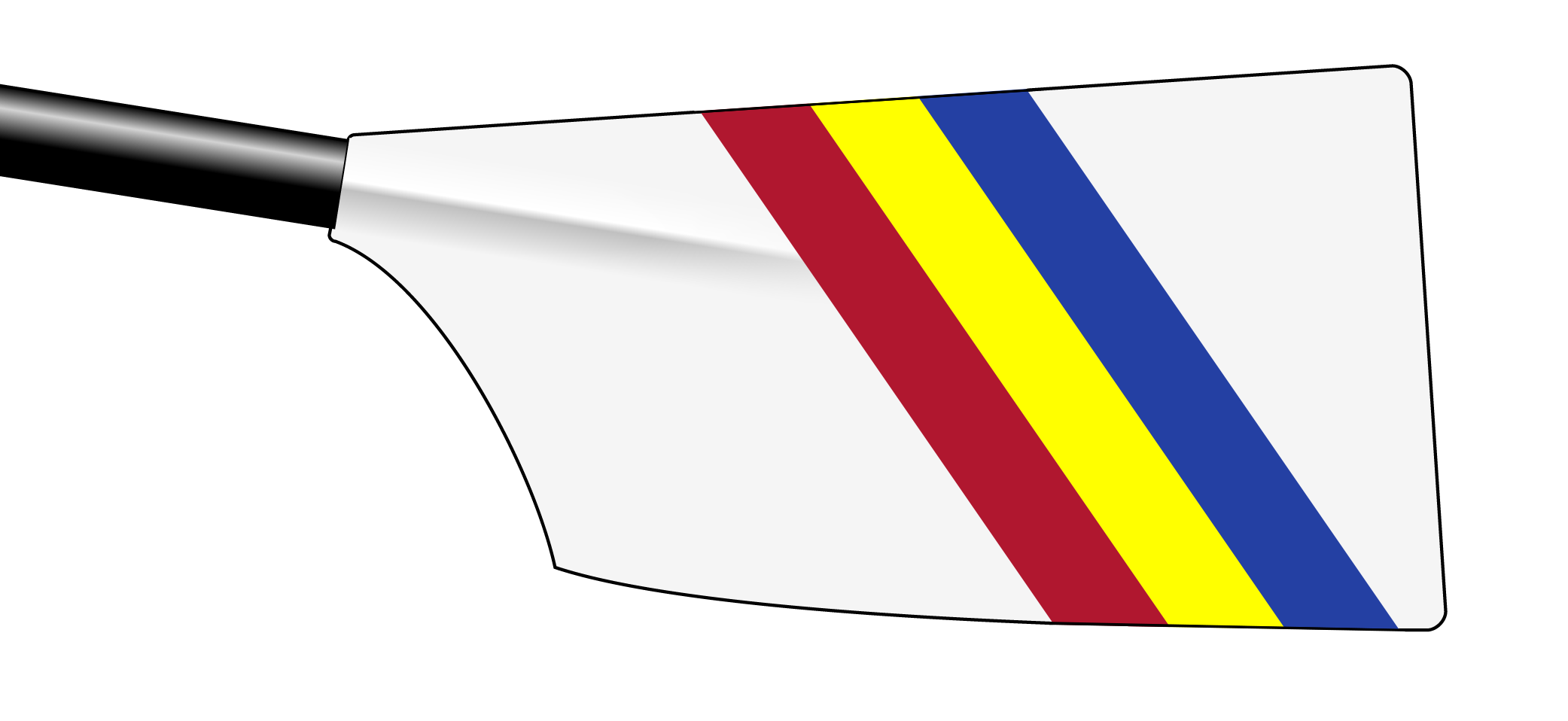
Oar design

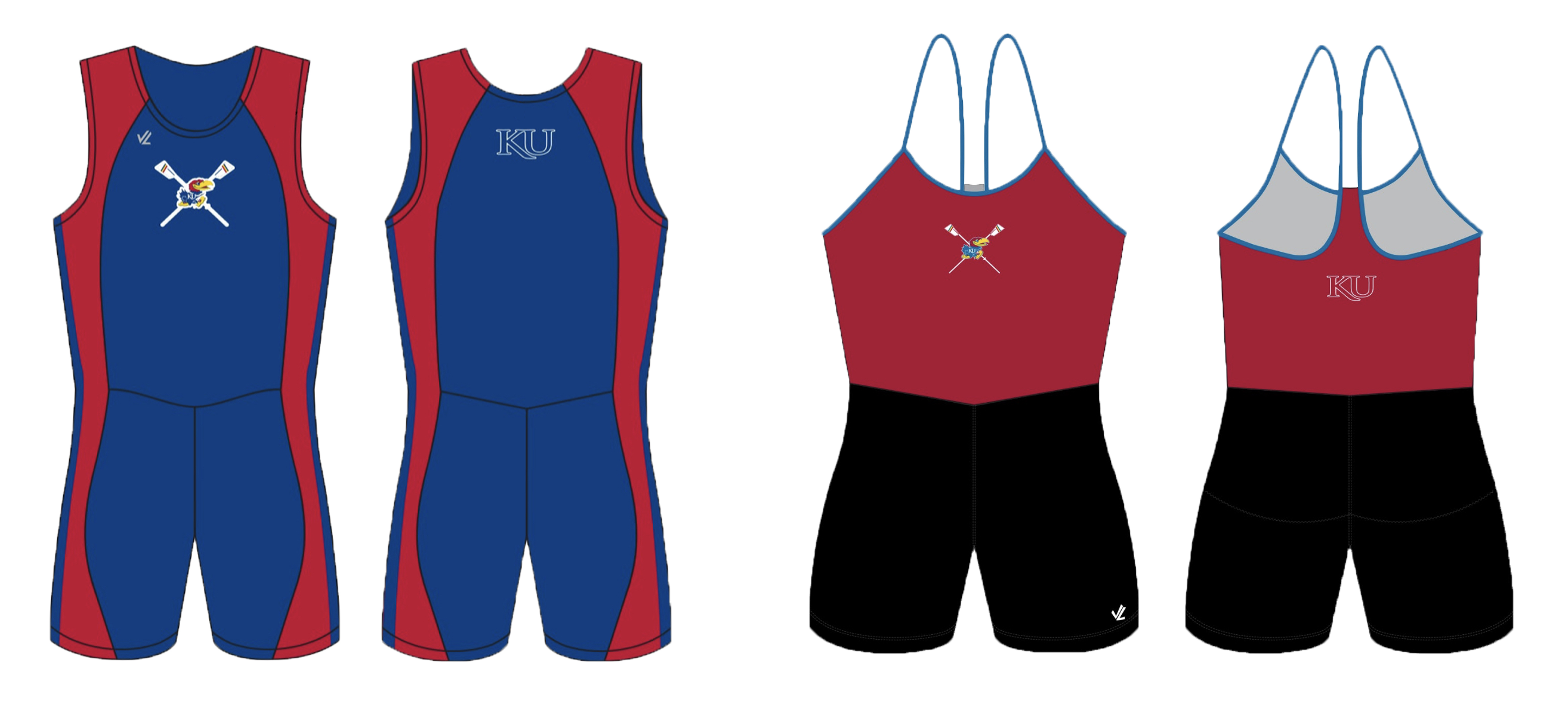
Men's and women's uniforms
