= Kansas Song =

Fight song of the University of Kansas

"Kansas Song (We’re From Kansas)" is a fight song of the University of Kansas.

== History ==
We're from Kansas, good old Kansas
Where the great big sunflow'rs grow
Oh, the girls are pretty, and when you see their smiles
You know the reason why we'd walk a thousand miles
Back to Kansas, good old Kansas, Where the skies are blue
There's lots of good old friends we can't forget
Kansas we're strong for you
Rock Chalk Jay Hawk tell 'em right out loud
That we're mighty proud, of our Kansas crowd
That's the place we intend to stay
Oh boy, we are glad to say
[Chorus reprise]
We're from Kansas, good old Kansas
Where the great big sunflow'rs grow
Oh, the girls are pretty, and when you see their smiles
You know the reason why we'd walk a thousand miles
Back to Kansas, good old Kansas, Where the skies are blue
There's lots of good old friends we can't forget
Kansas we're strong for you

The song was written by Carson J. Robison and Jack Riley. It was copyrighted 1922 by Abdallah Temple A.A.O.N.M.S. according to the sheet music.

The university bands usually play only one verse of the song.
