= KANU (FM) =

Kansas Public Radio
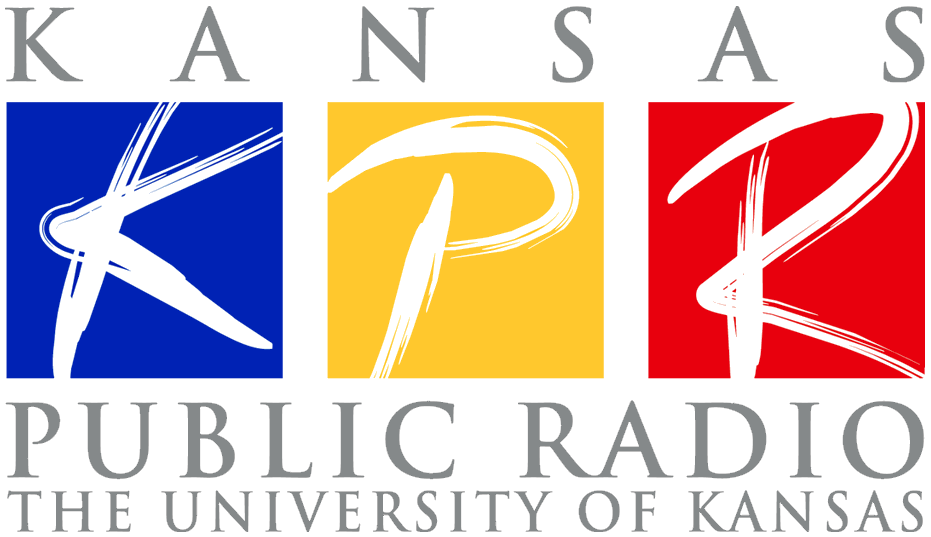
- Lawrence, Kansas; United States
- Broadcast area: Northeast and central Kansas
- Frequency: 91.5 MHz (HD Radio)
- Branding: Kansas Public Radio

Programming
- Format: NPR news, classical music, jazz
- Subchannels: HD2: KPR2 (NPR news, BBC World Service)
- Affiliations: National Public Radio, Public Radio International, American Public Media

Ownership
- Owner: University of Kansas

History
- First air date: 1952
- Call sign meaning: University of Kansas

Technical information
- Licensing authority: FCC
- Facility ID: 69350
- Class: C1
- ERP: 100,000 watts
- HAAT: 213 meters (699 ft)
- Transmitter coordinates: 38°57′13″N 95°16′12″W
- Translators: 89.9 K210CR (Atchinson); 99.5 K258BT (Manhattan); HD2: 96.1 K241AR (Lawrence); HD2: 97.9 K250AY (Manhattan)
- Repeaters: 89.7 KANH (Emporia); 90.3 KANQ (Chanute); 91.3 KANV (Olsburg)

Links
- Public license information: Public Radio Public file; LMS
- Webcast: Listen live
- Website: kansaspublicradio.org

KANU is the flagship station of Kansas Public Radio (KPR), a seven-station network based in Lawrence at the University of Kansas. In addition to KANU (91.5 FM), KPR also operates full-power stations KANH in Emporia (at 89.7 FM), KANV in Olsburg (at 91.3 FM, serving Manhattan and Junction City), and KANQ in Chanute (at 90.3 FM); and low-power translators K210CR in Atchison (at 89.9 FM), and K258BT (99.5 FM) and K250AY (97.9 FM) in Manhattan.

Together, the stations cover all of northeastern Kansas, as well as large portions of Missouri, including Kansas City. Flagship KANU provides much of the Kansas City area a second choice for NPR programming alongside KCUR (Lawrence is part of the Kansas City market). Its powerful 100,000-watt signal allows it to double as the main NPR station for the state capital, Topeka.

KANH, KANV, K210CR and K258BT serve as full repeaters of KANU.

KPR also operates an HD2 signal, which broadcasts a mix of National Public Radio and BBC news-talk programming. That signal is available online or with a special HD Radio. However, KANQ and K250AY broadcast the HD signal on a standard FM frequency.

A subcarrier of all KPR's signals broadcasts the Kansas Audio-Reader Network for the blind and print handicapped. The studios for both KPR and Audio-Reader are located inside KU's Broadcasting Hall on its campus on East Eleventh Street.

== History ==
KANU signed on for the first time on September 15, 1952. In 1961, it became the first noncommercial FM station to broadcast in stereo. It was a charter member of NPR, and was one of the 90 stations to carry the initial broadcast of All Things Considered in 1971.

KANU won a Peabody Award in 1974 for its weekly hour The American Past, hosted by journalism professor Calder Pickett. The program mixed audio clips and music of earlier times with historical narration, and was broadcast for 32 years until Pickett retired in 2005. The station also became known for classical music programs such as Opera Is My Hobby, hosted by Dr. Jim Seaver weekly for 59 years, and Dick Wright's The Jazz Scene on Saturday mornings. Current programs include the internationally syndicated music show The Retro Cocktail Hour.

In 2003, KANU adopted the more inclusive slogan Kansas Public Radio to reflect its rapidly growing broadcast footprint.

== See also ==
- Right Between the Ears
