= Kansas Audio-Reader Network =

American radio reading service for the blind

The Kansas Audio-Reader Network (generally called Audio-Reader) is a radio reading service for the blind in Lawrence, Kansas. The program began operating on October 11, 1971, and is the second to operate in the United States. Audio-Reader broadcasts the content of books, newspapers, magazines, and other printed materials via a closed-circuit radio to certified users in Kansas, Missouri and Oklahoma. In addition to the radio program, Audio-Reader operates other services for the blind, including a telephone information service called Telephone Reader, audio description of theater in Kansas City, Missouri, and Lawrence, Kansas, cassette taping of printed materials, and a sensory garden.

Audio-Reader is funded through public and private sources, and is run through the University of Kansas (KU) through KU's public radio station, KANU. A staff of thirteen operate the service, supervising three hundred volunteers, who record materials at the on-campus office or through telephone headsets from their homes. In addition, the service has live broadcasts of daily newspapers, and some volunteers travel to theaters in the area to provide descriptions of theater performances.

== History ==
Anne "Petey" Cerf, a Lawrence resident, began working in the mid-1960s to find a way to provide written materials for people unable to use standard print using radio, and hired Midwest Research Institute to determine the feasibility of such a project, originally focusing on using the same radio channels used by Muzak. MRI's report was discouraging, as was the reaction of a major organization for the blind, whose director told Ms. Cerf "The blind don't need a special radio service." On a visit to the Library of Congress, Cerf discovered that Stan Potter and Bob Watson, two amateur radio operators, had developed the first radio reading service, through Minnesota Public Radio in 1969. Cerf contacted Potter, and with his help, she worked to start a similar program in Kansas. Cerf presented the idea to the University of Kansas, offering to fund the first two years of its operation, provided the university would administer the program. KANU began operating Audio-Reader in 1971.

Audio-Reader began its operation in the kitchen of KU's Sudler House in 1971. Shortly after that, the service was moved to a trailer outside of the house, where it remained for a number of years. During this period, volunteers recalled live broadcasts that were interrupted by heavy rainstorms or squirrels running along the tin roof of the trailer. By the late 1970s, Stan Potter and Audio-Reader director Rosie Hurwitz collaborated to create the Association of Radio Reading Services, which came to be known as the International Association of Audio Information Services (IAAIS) over time. Hurwitz also served as one of the two original presidents of the association, Stan Potter being the other original president.

In 1988, Audio-Reader purchased its current facility, a 1920s Tudor-style house, with funding from the Baehr Foundation. The house had once belonged to Phi Kappa Tau, a campus fraternity. Audio-Reader renovated and continues to occupy the house, now called the Baehr house, which contains several small recording studios and an 'air studio' for managing broadcasts. In 2002, the University of Kansas moved the public radio station, now called Kansas Public Radio, to Audio-Reader's site, creating a new building attached to the Baehr house, and putting the two separate staffs in closer proximity.

Audio-Reader's current director as of 2007, Janet Campbell, was made interim director of KANU, and she presently runs both organizations as director.

"For Your Ears Only", an annual music sale in Lawrence begun in 2003, is a fundraiser put on by Audio-Reader's staff at the Douglas County Fairgrounds.

In July 2005, Audio-Reader hosted the 2005 IAAIS Conference.

In August 2018, KU announced that it would discontinue funding for the Kansas Audio-Reader Network over the next three years.

== Technology ==
Audio-Reader operates on a radio subcarrier frequency 'underneath' KANU's broadcast on 91.5 FM, a common arrangement for radio reading services that allows them to provide copyrighted materials without violating copyright law by broadcasting to the general public. Only radios that are capable of receiving subcarrier channels can pick up such programming. Audio-Reader is only allowed to provide these radios to users who can certify a print-disability from a medical doctor or social service agent.

In 1994, Audio-Reader created software for an information delivery system for the telephone called Telephone Reader, which is composed of a computer server connected to a number of phone lines which allows recording and playback of material via the telephone. This program is also used by a few other reading services in the United States. Audio-Reader's version is called the Kansas Lions Telephone Reader, which includes recordings in English and Spanish.

== Volunteers and Users ==
Audio-Reader presently has a group of over three hundred volunteers, serving 5,000 registered clients. Volunteers record books and magazines for later airing on Audio-Reader's radio service, and do live broadcasts of daily newspapers starting at 8 a.m. Telephone Reader volunteers come in starting at 6:00 a.m. CT to begin recording newspaper materials.

Eleanor Symons, the first person to volunteer for the service, has remained a volunteer for the service from its inception to the present day, reading three times a week.

Listeners to Audio-Reader's service must be unable to use normal printed materials. In most cases, listeners are partially or completely blind, but some listeners have other disabilities, such as dyslexia or allergies to newsprint. A number of Audio-Reader listeners are elderly and have the condition macular degeneration.
