= Intercultural therapy =

Intercultural therapy is a form of psychotherapy aimed at benefiting culturally diverse groups. It recognises the importance of race, culture, beliefs, values, attitudes, religion and language in the life of the client. The concept has been developed by Jafar Kareem in his book Intercultural Therapy. Kareem (1992) believed that there are some intrinsic differences between individual human beings, either in their biology, their personality or both, and that both inter- and intrapsychic events profoundly affect an individual's psyche and develop as part of their unconscious life. The events of the external world, then, are real but they are also internalised.

Intercultural therapy responds to the cultural variances identified by the field of anthropology. An intercultural therapist must take the external realities of a client's life into account, such as poverty, refugee status, racism, sexism, physical health and physical abilities. Kareem believed that failure to understand cultural issues may lead to major diagnostic and therapeutic errors.

Intercultural therapy recognises the differences and similarities of various aspects of culture for both the client and therapist, and that the very fact of being from another culture involves both conscious and unconscious assumptions, both in the patient and in the therapist. These unconscious assumptions sometimes mean traditional modes of therapy do not address the needs of someone from outside a dominant culture, or that therapy is not offered to them in the first place.
