= Bennett scale =

Cultural anthropology

The Bennett scale, also called the Developmental Model of Intercultural Sensitivity (DMIS), was developed by Milton Bennett. The framework describes the different ways in which people can react to cultural differences. Bennett's initial idea was for trainers to utilize the model to evaluate trainees' intercultural awareness and help them improve intercultural sensitivity, also sometimes referred to as cultural sensitivity, which is the ability of accepting and adapting to a brand new and different culture.

Organized into six stages of increasing sensitivity to difference, the DMIS identifies the underlying cognitive orientations individuals use to understand cultural difference. Each position along the continuum represents increasingly complex perceptual organizations of cultural difference, which in turn allow increasingly sophisticated experiences of other cultures. By identifying the underlying experience of cultural difference, predictions about behavior and attitudes can be made and education can be tailored to facilitate development along the continuum. The first three stages are ethnocentric as one sees his own culture as central to reality. Climbing the scale, one develops a more and more ethnorelative point of view, meaning that one experiences one's own culture as in the context of other cultures. By the fourth stage, ethnocentric views are replaced by ethnorelative views.

== Developmental model of intercultural sensitivity (Six stages of Bennett scale) ==
1-3 stages reflect ethnocentrism in cross-cultural communication. During these three phases, a person sees their original culture as the most superior one and takes it as the criteria to judge other cultures.

1. Denial of difference
  - Individuals experience their own culture as the only "real" one, while other cultures are either not noticed at all or are understood in an undifferentiated, simplistic manner. People at this position are generally uninterested in cultural difference, but when confronted with difference their seemingly benign acceptance may change to aggressive attempts to avoid or eliminate it. Most of the time, this is a result of physical or social isolation, where the person's views are never challenged and are at the center of their reality. Members of dominant culture are more likely to have a denial orientation towards cultural diversity.
2. Defense of difference
  - Differences are acknowledged, but they are denigrated rather than embraced. Rather, one' s own culture is experienced as the most "evolved" or best way to live. This position is characterized by dualistic us/them thinking and frequently accompanied by overt negative stereotyping. They will openly belittle the differences among their culture and another, denigrating race, gender or any other indicator of difference. People at this position are more openly threatened by cultural difference and more likely to be acting aggressively against it.
3. Minimization of difference
  - People recognize superficial cultural differences in food, customs, etc. and have somewhat positive view about cultural differences. But they still emphasize human similarity in physical structure, psychological needs, and/or assumed adherence to universal values. People at this position are likely to assume that they are no longer ethnocentric, and they tend to overestimate their tolerance while underestimating the effect (e.g. “privilege”) of their own culture. They usually assumes that our own set of fundamental behavioral categories are absolute and universal.
4. Acceptance of difference
  - One's own culture is experienced as one of a number of equally complex worldviews. People at this position appreciate and accept the existence of culturally different ways of organizing human existence, although they do not necessarily like or agree with every way. They can identify how culture affects a wide range of human experience and they have a framework for organizing observations of cultural difference. We recognize people from this stage through their desire to be informed or proactively learn about alien cultures, and not to confirm prejudices.
5. Adaptation to difference
  - Individuals are able to expand their own worldviews to accurately understand other cultures and behave in a variety of culturally appropriate ways. In this stage, multicultural participants start to develop intercultural communication skills, change their communication styles, and effectively use empathy or frame of reference shifting, to understand and be understood across cultural boundaries. At this stage, one is able to act properly outside of one's own culture.
6. Integration of difference
  - One's experience of self is expanded to include the movement in and out of different cultural worldviews. People at this position have a definition of self that is "marginal" (not central) to any particular culture, allowing this individual to shift rather smoothly from one cultural worldview to another. At this point, a will to comprehend and adopt various beliefs and norms begins to emerge, demonstrating a high level of intercultural sensitivity.

4-6 stages reflect ethnorelativism in cross-cultural communication. During these three phases, a person gradually treats all culture as reasonable and try to understand every behavior from the aspect of cultures behind.

== Evolutionary strategies ==
In his theory, Bennett describes what changes occur when evolving through each step of the scale. Summarized, they are the following:

1. From denial to defense: the person acquires an awareness of difference between cultures
2. From defense to minimization: negative judgments are depolarized, and the person is introduced to similarities between cultures.
3. From minimization to acceptance: the subject grasps the importance of intercultural difference.
4. From acceptance to adaptation: exploration and research into the other culture begins
5. From adaptation to integration: subject develops empathy towards the other culture.

== Application of Bennett scale for the study of various topics ==
=== Diversity in education ===
Schools play an important role in shaping the multicultural perspective of students. A study published in 2011 by Frank Hernandez and Brad W. Kose found that the Bennett Scale provides a robust measure of principals' cultural competence in terms of how they understand differences. Principals' DMIS orientation how they could influence their understanding of social justice and further make them implement different leadership practices for diverse schools. Specifically, the researchers provided various explanations of the pervasive performance gap that sees white children outperforming their black or Latino classmates on standardised tests, academics, and school completion based on the Bennett Scale as a theoretical framework. Education professionals may rationalize school policies and activities for cultural diversity and help achieve cultural equality in the educational environment by determining which of the six phases of intercultural sensitivity the particular principal is in. For instance, a principal in minimization phase may organize international cuisine festivals in the school, or use cultural and heritage festivals as opportunities for intercultural education. But since it overlooks cultural distinctions, the school might not consider to launch a multicultural program or make curriculum changes that respect students' cultural nuances.

Another study applied Bennett Scale to the curriculum of university general education courses. In the current context of globalization and growing diversity in schools, experiencing and learning about cultural differences in the school environment is an important instructional method. This study used Bennett Scale as an analytical model, coded and quantitatively analyzed data of cross-cultural sensitivity among 48 students from multicultural backgrounds receiving university general education. According to the findings, a diversity curriculum that motivates students to share and practice their viewpoints on social issues is more likely to foster empathy and raise levels of cross-cultural sensitivity than one that only emphasizes information comprehension with assignments including material reading and essay writing.

=== Intercultural communication ===
Bennett Scale has mostly been applied to analysis on people's cross-cultural sensitivity, but some scholars have expanded its application to organizational communications. Informed by Bennett Scale and Botan's Five steps in Issue Management model, Radu Dumitrascu developed a new corporate adaptation model and follow-up intercultural communication approaches for international business. According to how they handle cultural diversity and cultural affiliations and localize themselves through communication, structural adjustments, strategies, and tactics, five types of organizations are defined: denying/intransigent, minimizing/resistant, minimizing/cooperative, adaptive/cooperative, integrative.

== Critiques of Bennett scale ==
Bennett Scale is recognized for defining clear ethnocentric and ethnorelative stages, however, it is also considered by some scholars to be too idealistic to be practiced in the reality. Primary critiques include:

- Does not apply to short-term cultural adaptation because of its progressive nature
- Neglect the relationship between interculturality and language
- Assume monocultural origin and no previous contact with other cultures, which does not take into account people from multicultural backgrounds

Besides, several researchers report a struggle to determine participants' orientation within the six stages of Bennett Scale due to the lack of transitional middle ground between stages. The model is also critiqued for working well in nations where multiculturalism is easily embraced, like the United States, but its practical applicability in isolated or undeveloped nations where people have little exposure to other cultures is still questioned.
