= Community Tool Box =

Public service of the University of Kansas

The Community Tool Box is a public service of the University of Kansas in Lawrence, Kansas, United States. It is maintained by the Work Group for Community Health and Development at the University of Kansas (formerly KU Work Group). The Community Tool Box is a free, online resource that contains thousands of pages of practical information for promoting community health and development, and is a global resource for anyone engaged in the work of community health and development.

== History ==
The Community Tool Box was founded in 1995 by colleagues at the University of Kansas (including Stephen Fawcett, Jerry Schultz, and Vincent Francisco) in partnership with other national partners, including Bill Berkowitz and Tom Wolff. Phil Rabinowitz has been a major contributor to content for the Community Tool Box. The website was created by the Schiefelbusch Institute for Life Span Studies at the university. With over 7,000 pages of information, the Community Tool Box contains guides and aids for problem solving common barriers faced in community development. In 2006, the website had a daily average of 3,315 visitors. It was initially an offline project which provided information to people about substance abuse and gun violence but later expanded to the Internet so that it could reach more people. The website serves as a resource for community improvement efforts, and has become widely used as text for courses in the following disciplines: public health, community health, social work, community psychology, and nursing.

The development of the Community Tool Box has been supported by funds from the Robert Wood Johnson Foundation and the John D. and Catherine T. MacArthur Foundation, and the Kansas Health Foundation.

== Site features and resources ==
With funding support from the Robert Wood Johnson Foundation, and with the support of a team of 75 translators around the world, the Community Tool Box is available in English and Spanish.

The resources of the Community Tool Box are organized in a user-friendly format. It contains a table of contents which links to 300 sections providing practical, step-by-step guidance in community-building skills. It also has forums and chat rooms, which allow users to request assistance from the community.

== Institutional Background ==
The Work Group for Community Health and Development is a research, teaching and public service organization which was established in 1975 and is based at the University of Kansas. The Work Group has been designated a World Health Organization Collaborating Centre since 2004. Over the past three decades, the Work Group has researched, implemented, and evaluated community-based efforts to create environments that promote health and well-being.
