= E.S. Wibbeke =

American organisational theorist (1965–2017)

Eileen Sheridan Wibbeke (November 4, 1965 – August 27, 2017) was an Irish-American organizational theorist, intercultural consultant, and author in the field of global leadership known for the development of Wibbeke’s Geoleadership Model of global business leadership competencies.

== Biography ==
Born in Los Angeles to Irish parents, Wibbeke in 1987 received a BA from Loyola Marymount University and in 1992 and MBA from the Thunderbird School of Global Management. In 2005, Wibbeke received a Doctorate in Management (Organizational Leadership) for the thesis: Intercultural Leadership Competencies for U.S. Business Leaders in the New Millennium.

In 1987, Wibbeke started a career at the Los Angeles World Affairs Council, wherein major business, cultural, and political figures gave lectures on current topics. These included Ronald Reagan, King Juan Carlos I of Spain, Carl Sagan, and Senator Edward Kennedy.

In 1992, Wibbeke worked at Xerox Corporation in managing corporate revenue. In 1994, Wibbeke led the volunteer workforce for the FIFA World Cup, including the semi-finals and final matches at the Rose Bowl stadium in Pasadena, California. Wibbeke was recruited to relocate to Silicon Valley in 1996, and began a decade assisting high-technology firms in their global marketing endeavors. Such firms included Borland International, PointCast, Novell (under CEO Eric Schmidt, later of Google), and Siebel Systems.

The first edition of Wibbeke's text appeared in 2008 with the title, Global Business Leadership, published by Elsevier (Butterworth-Heinemann) in Oxford, UK. Wibbeke was asked to present the book at a Google Tech Talk in 2008. The book also won the 2008 San Diego Book Awards prize for Best Business Book. The second edition of Global Business Leadership was published in 2014 by Taylor & Francis (Routledge).

Wibbeke then began a tenure of teaching at several universities, including the University of California (Santa Cruz), the University of Liverpool, and the Thunderbird School of Global Management.

Wibbeke holds dual citizenship with the United States and the Republic of Ireland and is a Novell Certified Internet Business Strategist. Wibbeke currently is on the U.S. Fulbright Specialist Roster and has already completed one grant in New Zealand (2015) on the topic of Geoleadership.

Dr. Wibbeke was invited to the Virginia Military Institute (aka VMI) in 2016 to speak about the Geoleadership Model to cadets and military faculty during their 7th Annual VMI Leadership and Ethics Conference. Virginia Military Institute is a small, public, nationally ranked college committed to leadership development in a military environment in Lexington, Virginia. The speaker for this 7th annual conference was the Honorable James A. Baker, the former White House Chief of Staff, The U.S. Secretary of State, and U.S. Secretary of the Treasury.

== Work ==
Wibbeke’s Geoleadership Model of Global Business Leadership Competencies

Wibbeke’s Geoleadership Model of Global Business Leadership Competencies is a framework for global leadership applied to business, cross-cultural communication, and management. This model of global business competencies has seven dimensions.

1. Capability (Capable of intercultural learning agility)
2. Care (Capable of equal concern for stakeholders and bottom line)
3. Communication (Capable of open and respectful dialogue through active listening)
4. Consciousness (Capable of self-awareness without personal bias)
5. Context (Capable of perceiving, discerning, and adapting to work situations)
6. Contrasts (Capable of perceiving multiple levels of meaning simultaneously)
7. Change (Capable of working flexibly within complex socio-cultural system)

== Publications ==
=== Selected books ===
- 2002. Beyond Borders: Web Globalization Strategies by John Yunker. Wibbeke was Technical Editor: https://books.google.com/books?id=tJ0JcoLfeloC
- 2008. Global Business Leadership 2014. First Edition. Foreword by General Walter Ulmer: http://www.ila-net.org/Members/PublicationFeatures/View_Publication_Feature.asp?DBID=44
- 2014. Global Business Leadership 2014. Second Edition. Foreword by Warren Bennis: https://books.google.com/books?id=offeAQAAQBAJ&q=wibbeke
- 2015. The Quest for Leadership. 2015. First Edition. Wibbeke contributed Chapter 12. https://www.amazon.com/The-Quest-Leadership-Influence-Presidential/dp/1604979100

=== Selected articles ===
- Wibbeke, E.S. & Loubier-Ricca, C. (2010). Shanghai motors: A case study in geoleadership. Business Coaching Worldwide: http://www.wabccoaches.com/bcw/2010_v6_i1/feature-article.html
- Interviewee (Online Government Magazine): (2009). Interview with Foreign Affairs and International Trade (Government of Canada) – Are You A Geoleader? http://www.international.gc.ca/cfsi-icse/cil-cai/magazine/v05n03/1-3-eng.asp
