= Milton Bennett =

American sociologist

- Born: Milton James Bennett

Academic background
- Education: Stanford University; San Francisco State University; University of Minnesota
- Thesis: Forming/Feeling Process (1977)

Academic work
- Discipline: Sociology
- Sub-discipline: Cultural sociology
- Institutions: Portland State University
- Notable ideas: Bennett scale

Milton James Bennett, often cited as Milton J. Bennett, is an American sociologist. He is credited as the creator of the Developmental Model of Intercultural Sensitivity (DMIS).

Bennett was a tenured professor at Portland State University and is now an adjunct professor of intercultural studies in the Department of Sociology of the University of Milano Bicocca. He has received prizes from the Society for Intercultural Education, Training and Research (SIETAR) and from NAFSA: Association of International Educators.

== Books ==
- Basic Concepts of Intercultural Communication: Paradigms, Principles, and Practices, Intercultural Press, 2013
- The Handbook of Intercultural Training (ed.), SAGE Publishing, 2004
- American Cultural Patterns: A Cross-Cultural Perspective, co-author with Edward Stewart, Intercultural Press, 1991
