= University of Kansas =

Public university in Lawrence, Kansas, U.S.

- Motto: Videbo visionem hanc magnam quare non comburatur rubus (Latin)
- Motto in English: "I will see this great vision in which the bush does not burn." (Exodus 3:3)
- Type: Public research university
- Established: March 21, 1865; 161 years ago
- Parent institution: Kansas Board of Regents
- Accreditation: HLC
- Academic affiliations: AAU; space-grant
- Endowment: $2.69 billion (FY2025)
- Budget: $1.15 billion (FY2026) (Note: Data includes Lawrence and Edwards campuses.)
- Chancellor: Doug Girod
- Provost: Arash Mafi
- Academic staff: 3,421 (fall 2025) (Note: Data includes Lawrence, Edwards, and KUMC campuses.)
- Total staff: 15,301 (fall 2025)
- Students: 31,169 (fall 2025)
- Undergraduates: 22,544 (fall 2025)
- Postgraduates: 8,625 (fall 2025)
- Location: Lawrence, Kansas, United States; 38.9584°N 95.2478°W
- Campus: 1,000 acres (4.0 km^{2}); Small city
- Other campuses: Garden City; Hays; Leavenworth; Kansas City; Overland Park; Parsons; Salina; Topeka; Wichita; Online
- Newspaper: The University Daily Kansan
- Colors: Crimson and blue
- Nickname: Jayhawks
- Sporting affiliations: NCAA Division I FBS – Big 12
- Mascots: Big Jay; Baby Jay; Jay Doc (Medical Center)
- Website: www.ku.edu

U.S. National Register of Historic Places
- Official name: University of Kansas Historic District
- Type: District
- Criteria: Architecture, Education, Landscape
- Designated: April 16, 2013
- Reference no.: 13000167

U.S. National Register of Historic Places
- Official name: University of Kansas East Historic District
- Type: District
- Criteria: Architecture, Education
- Designated: January 8, 2014
- Reference no.: 13001038

The University of Kansas (KU) is a public research university with its main campus in Lawrence, Kansas, United States. It is governed by the Kansas Board of Regents. Two branch campuses are in the Kansas City metropolitan area on the Kansas side: the university's medical school and hospital in Kansas City, Kansas; and the Edwards Campus in Overland Park. There are also educational and research sites in Garden City, Hays, Leavenworth, Parsons, and Topeka, an agricultural education center in rural north Douglas County, and branches of the medical school in Salina and Wichita. The university is a member of the Association of American Universities and classified among "R1: Doctoral Universities – Very high research activity".

Founded March 21, 1865, the university was opened in 1866 under a charter granted by the Kansas State Legislature in 1864 and legislation passed in 1863 under the state constitution, which was adopted two years after the 1861 admission of the former Kansas Territory as the 34th state into the Union.

As of fall 2025, 27,212 students were enrolled at the Lawrence and Edwards campuses with an additional 3,957 students enrolled at the University of Kansas Medical Center (KUMC) for a total enrollment of 31,169 students across the three campuses. Overall, the university (including KUMC) employed 3,421 faculty members in fall 2025.

Kansas's athletic teams compete in NCAA Division I sports as the Jayhawks, as members of the Big 12 Conference. They field 16 varsity sports, as well as club-level sports for ice hockey, rugby, men's volleyball, soccer, basketball, rock climbing, triathlon, cross country, track, swim, pickleball, table tennis, and water skiing.

== History ==
On February 20, 1863, Kansas Governor Thomas Carney signed into law a bill creating the state university in Lawrence. The law was conditioned upon a gift from Lawrence of a $15,000 endowment fund and a site for the university, in or near the town, of not less than forty acres (16 hectares) of land. If Lawrence failed to meet these conditions, Emporia would get the university instead of Lawrence.

The site selected for the university was a hill known as Hogback Ridge (later known as Mount Oread), which was privately donated by Charles L. Robinson, the Republican governor of the state of Kansas from 1861 to 1863, and one of the original settlers of Lawrence, Kansas. Robinson and his wife Sara bestowed the 40-acre (16 ha) site to the State of Kansas in exchange for land elsewhere. The philanthropist Amos Adams Lawrence donated $10,000 of the necessary endowment fund, and the citizens of Lawrence raised the remaining money themselves via private donations. On November 2, 1863, Governor Carney announced Lawrence had met the conditions to get into the state university, and the following year the university was officially organized. The school's Board of Regents held its first meeting in March 1865, which is the event that KU dates its founding from. Work on the first college building began later that year. The school opened for classes on September 12, 1866, and the first class graduated in 1873. According to William L. Burdick, the first degree awarded by the university was a Doctor of Divinity, bestowed upon noted abolitionist preacher Richard Cordley.

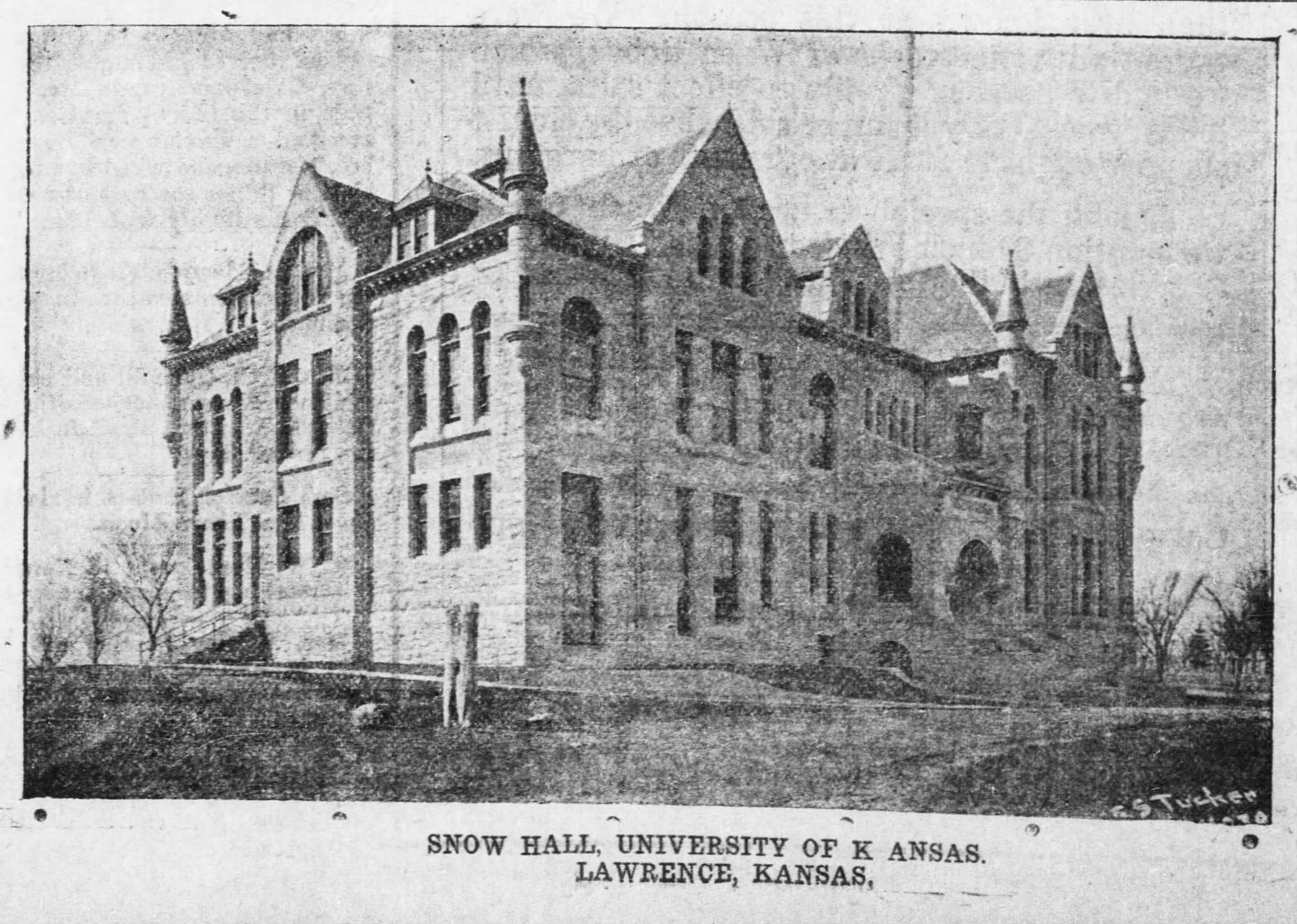
Snow Hall, 1915

During the early development of the University of Kansas, Chancellors Joshua Lippincott, Francis H. Snow, and Frank Strong, along with the Kansas Board of Regents, worked to establish the university as not only a center for higher education but also a representative agency of the state. Snow, who served from 1890 to 1901, emphasized scientific research and public engagement, while Strong, beginning in 1902, advanced the university’s role in public service. This vision aligned with the sentiments expressed by Professor M. S. Ward, who stated in 1891 that "Students should find in the University preparation for all the various pursuits and callings of society. The ultimate aim of our own State University ought to be [promoting] the highest Christian culture, an ample professional training, [which] will make our civilization the highest possible on earth."

In 1885, Blanche Ketene Bruce became the first African American to graduate from the University. (He earned an A.B. degree.)

In an effort to appeal to the predominantly Christian population of Kansas, many of who in the early history of the university were critical of state money being used to fund a secular institution, Chancellor Lippincott sought to reassure the public that the University of Kansas maintained strong Christian values. In response to a concerned parent questioning the university’s mission, Lippincott wrote, "The University is a Christian institution founded by a Christian state. We have daily prayers conducted for the most part by members of the Faculty of whom nearly all are Christian and several ministers of the Gospel."

Although the university was a secular institution, religion remained a central cultural force among students. In an 1880 community letter, an anonymous student reflected on the broader moral and spiritual purpose of education at KU, writing, "We are all seeking the truth, we are all earnest in our effort to correctly solve the great problem of a worthy and useful existence—we all recognize the wonderful features of a Christian age and a Christian country and we all hope to be true men and women [of the country] and almost all acknowledge that in accomplishing this we need an inspiration which is not of this earth nor fashioned after this world."

The Cutler Family Chabad house opened near campus in 2025, with a synagogue, library and Lawrence's first commercial kosher kitchen.

Chancellor Lippincott emphasized the importance of individual development in higher education, distinguishing universities from more rigid collegiate institutions in other parts of the country. In a lecture to students, James Marvin, the third Chancellor of the university stated, "Higher education should aid students to realize all their potentialities, but only in a university are all individualities respected. Colleges that require all students [to] follow the same course have a factory air about them. Students go through the same milling process and come out machines, but God did not intend man to be a machine, and the University of Kansas should be about His work."

Beginning in 1880, the university began to field intercollegiate athletics programs, starting with baseball. The university would introduce football in 1890, men's basketball in 1898, a women's club basketball team in 1902, and various other varsity athletics programs throughout the 20th century.

During World War I, the University of Kansas became a key training ground for military personnel, and courses were added for male students to reflect this. Military drills and coursework in military science were made mandatory for male students, and in 1918, KU established a unit of the Students' Army Training Corps (SATC) to provide academic and military instruction. Faculty contributed to war-related research, while female students supported Red Cross efforts. Chancellor Frank Strong emphasized KU’s role in preparing students for both military service and national responsibility. Strong was a vocal opponent of the United States entering a foreign war, and helped found the Kansas Branch of the League to Enforce Peace in 1915, which was a collection of activists who were opposed to American involvement in foreign conflicts. Strong advocated for patriotism during his later years as Chancellor, stating at the University Assembly in 1915 that "it is America's destiny to preserve Western Civilization, which seems to be destroying itself abroad. While the youth of Europe are on its battlefields, the youth of America must seek higher education to enable them to carry on the material for the leadership of the world. America and its universities, with the University of Kansas having a big place among them, must become the center of the greatest intellectual life that the next generation should know." In April 1917, after Congress declared a state of war, Strong sent a letter to Congress stating that the university "has always been loyal to country and to the flag, and always will be."

During World War II, Kansas was one of 131 colleges and universities nationally that took part in the V-12 Navy College Training Program, which offered students a path to a Navy commission.

=== Landmarks and structures ===
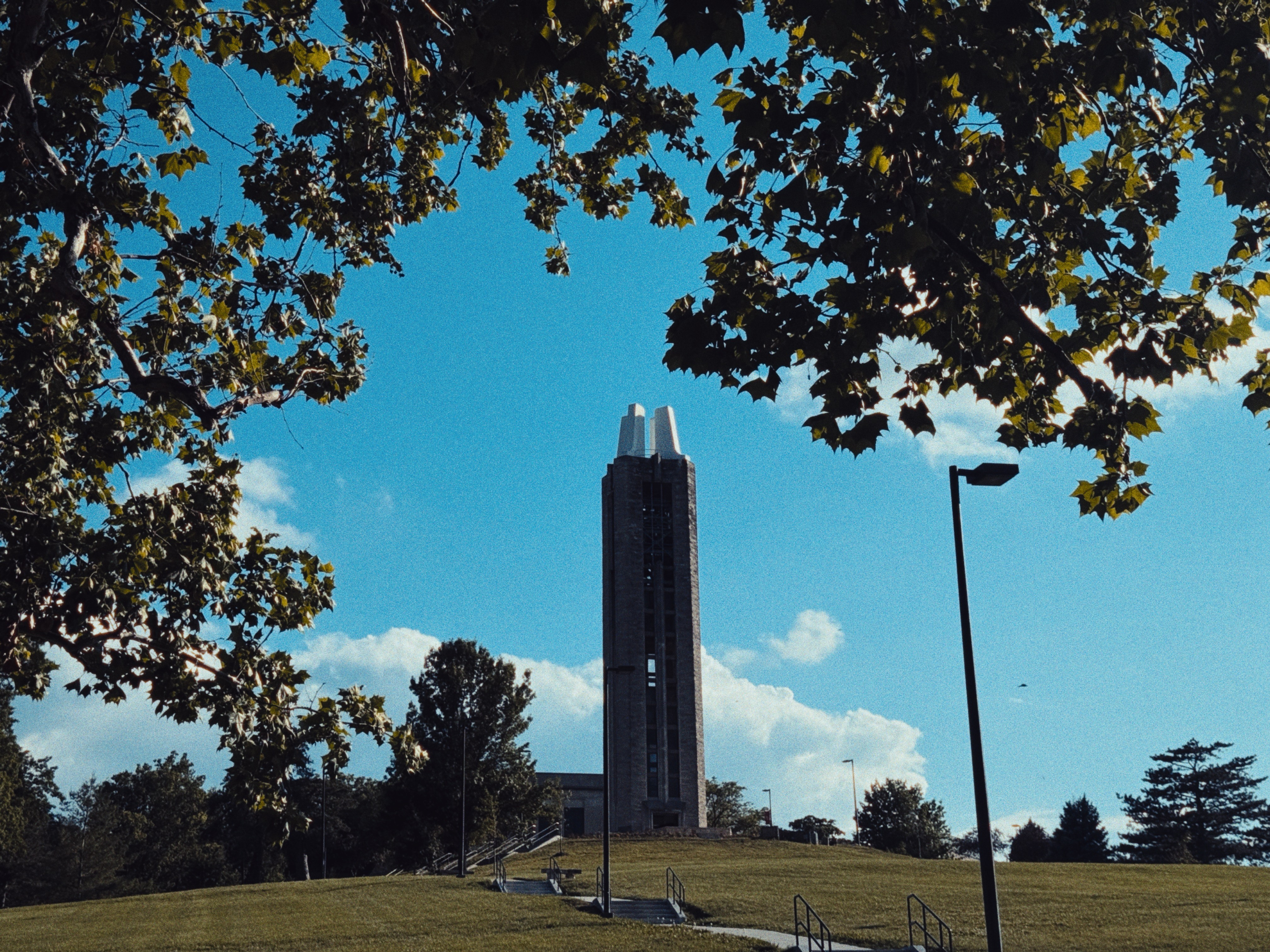
Kansas War Memorial Campanile in August 2025

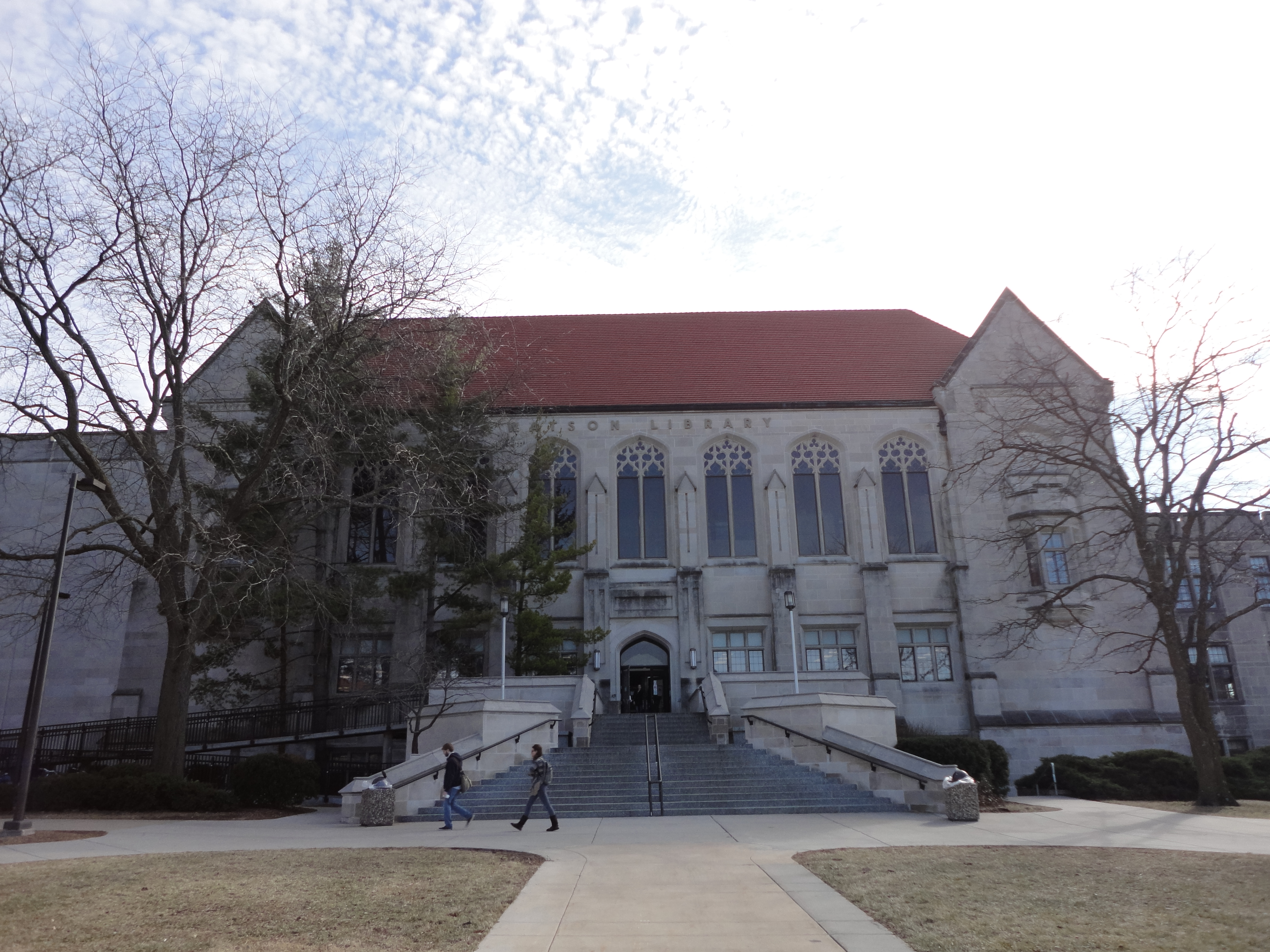
Watson Library, the main branch of the KU Libraries system

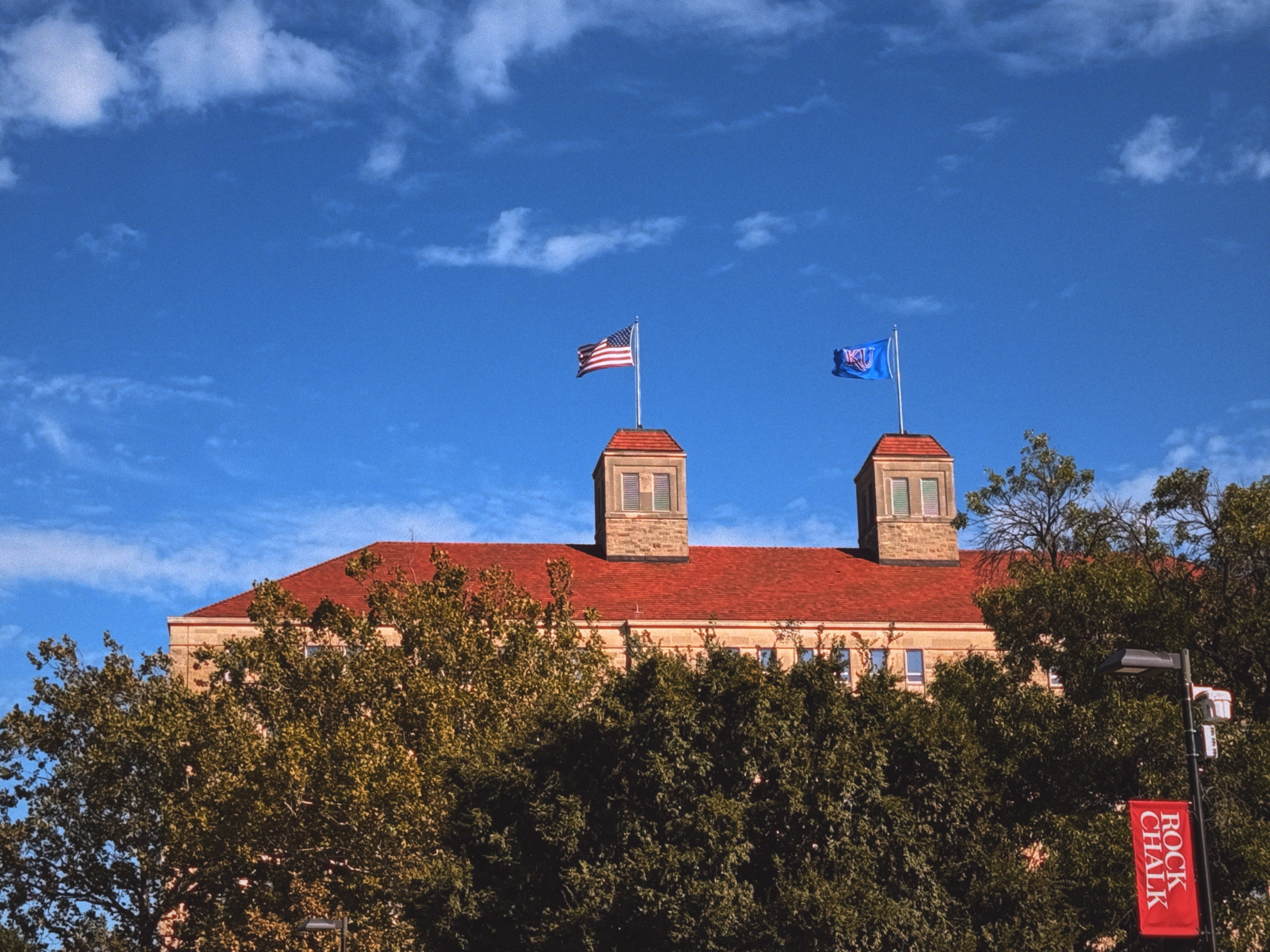
Kansas Fraser Hall in the Fall of 2025

KU is home to the Robert J. Dole Institute of Politics, the Beach Center on Disability, Lied Center of Kansas and radio stations KJHK, 90.7 FM, and KANU, 91.5 FM. The university is also host to several significant museums. These include the University of Kansas Natural History Museum, founded in 1927, which contains important collections in mammalogy, ornithology, vertebrate paleontology, and entomology; and the Spencer Museum of Art, founded in 1928, home to a wide variety of cultural materials from all around the world, with a particular emphasis on American Indian materials. The libraries of the university include Watson Library, Kenneth Spencer Research Library, the Murphy Art and Architecture Library, Thomas Gorton Music & Dance Library, and Anschutz Library. Of athletic note, the university is home to Allen Fieldhouse, which is heralded as one of the greatest basketball arenas in the world, and David Booth Kansas Memorial Stadium, which is the eighth oldest college football stadium in the country.

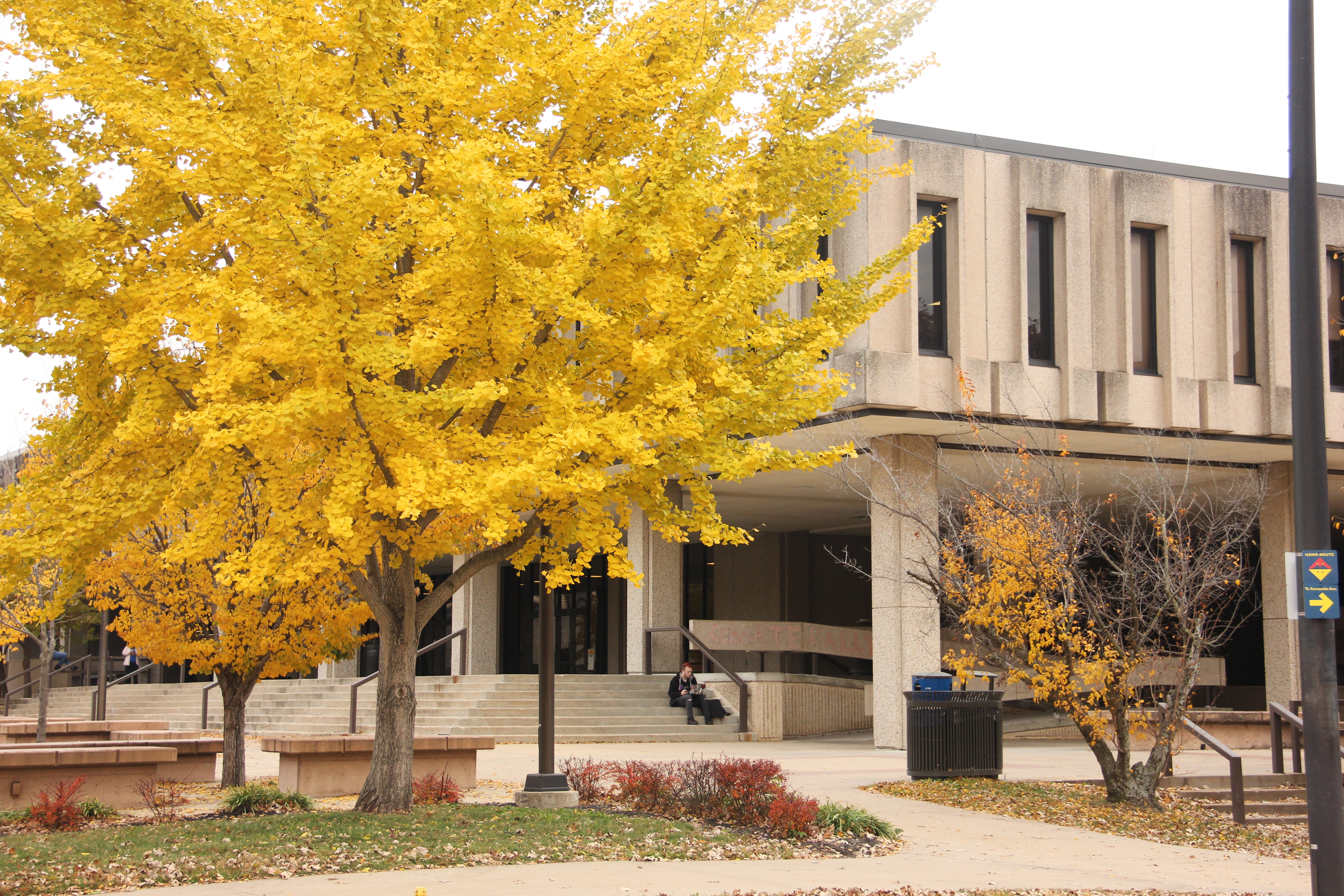
Wescoe Hall in the fall, part of the Liberal Arts Department

== Academics ==
Academic rankings

National
- Forbes: 165
- U.S. News & World Report: 143 (tie)
- Washington Monthly: 367
- WSJ/College Pulse: 249

Global
- ARWU: 301–400
- QS: 465 (tie)
- THE: 351–400
- U.S. News & World Report: 340 (tie)

The University of Kansas is a large, state-sponsored university with five campuses. KU is a member of the Association of American Universities (AAU) and is classified among "R1: Doctoral Universities – Very high research activity". KU features the College of Liberal Arts & Sciences, which includes the School of the Arts and the School of Public Affairs & Administration; and the schools of Architecture, Design & Planning; Business; Education; Engineering; Health Professions; Journalism & Mass Communications; Law; Medicine; Music; Nursing; Pharmacy; and Social Welfare. The university offers more than 345 degree programs. In 2017 Johnson County accounted for most of instate enrollment.

According to the National Science Foundation, KU spent $466 million on research and development in fiscal year 2023, ranking it 73rd in the nation.

=== School of Architecture and Design ===
The University of Kansas School of Architecture and Design (ArcD), with its main building being Marvin Hall, traces its architectural roots to the creation of the architectural engineering degree program in KU's School of Engineering in 1912. The Bachelor of Architecture degree was added in 1920. In 1969, the School of Architecture and Urban Design (SAUD) was formed. In 2001, architectural engineering merged with civil and environmental engineering. The design programs from the discontinued School of Fine Arts were merged into the school in 2009, forming the School of Architecture and Design.

The Department of Design began in 1921. The Bachelor of Fine Arts degree program began eight years later. Industrial Design was added in 1941, interior design in 1946, jewelry and silversmithing, art history, and the Masters of Fine Arts program in 1948.

In 2009, the university reorganized the School of Fine Arts. The professional design practice programs became the Department of Design, administratively located in the School of Architecture and Design.

=== School of Business ===
The University of Kansas School of Business is a public business school on the main campus of the University of Kansas in Lawrence, Kansas. The KU School of Business was founded in 1924 and has more than 130 faculty members and approximately 4,600 students, as of fall 2025.

The school and its accounting program hold accreditation from the Association to Advance Collegiate Schools of Business (AACSB).

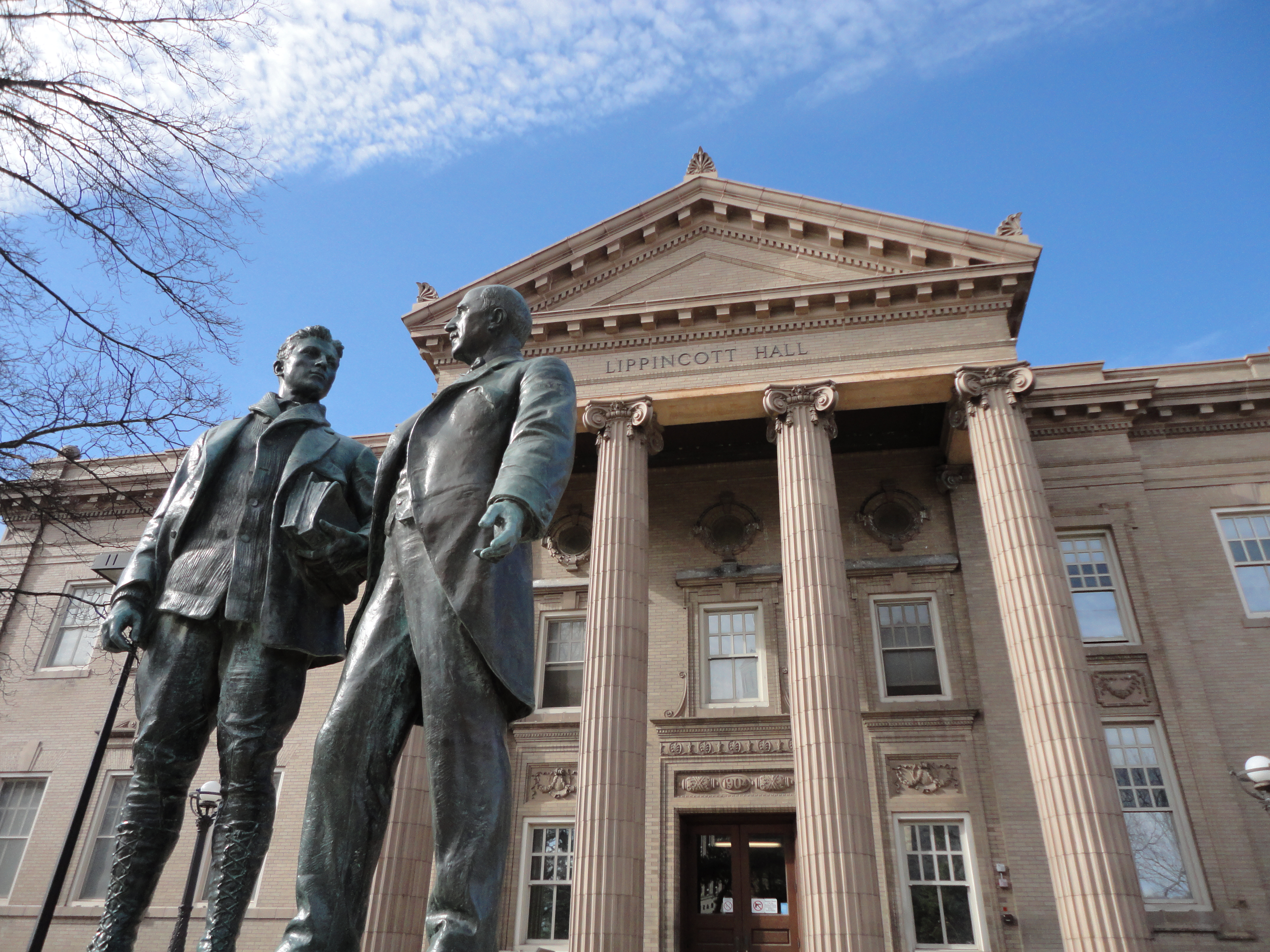
Lippincott Hall – offices of Study Abroad and The Wilcox Museum

U.S. News & World Report Best Colleges rankings lists KU's business school as 40th out of 367 public institutions for 2026.

U.S. News & World Report ranks the school's online MBA program 7th overall in its 2025 edition of the "Best Online Programs" list and the school's full-time MBA program 36th among public universities in its 2025 edition of the "Best Graduate School" rankings.

Accounting Today ranks the KU School of Business Master of Accounting program 9th out of 529 for its CPA Success Index Rating, a metric that evaluates how well collegiate accounting programs prepare students for the CPA exam.

In 2016, The University of Kansas completed construction on a new home for the business school, named Capitol Federal Hall. It is located at 1654 Naismith Drive, near KU's Rec Center and across the street from Allen Fieldhouse. Capitol Federal Hall is a 166,500-square-foot building complete with state-of-the-art technology and several research labs.

=== School of Law ===
The University of Kansas School of Law, founded in 1878, was the top law school in the state of Kansas, and tied for 70th out of 198 nationally, according to the 2021 U.S. News & World Report rankings. Classes are held in Green Hall at W 15th St and Burdick Dr, which is named after former dean James Green.

=== School of Engineering ===
The KU School of Engineering is a public engineering school located on the main campus. The School of Engineering was founded officially in 1891, although engineering degrees were awarded as early as 1873.

In the U.S. News & World Report's "America's Best Colleges" 2021 issue, KU's School of Engineering was ranked tied for 102nd among 218 engineering schools whose highest degree is a doctorate.

Notable alumni include Charles E. Spahr (1934), the former CEO of Standard Oil of Ohio.

=== School of Journalism and Mass Communications ===
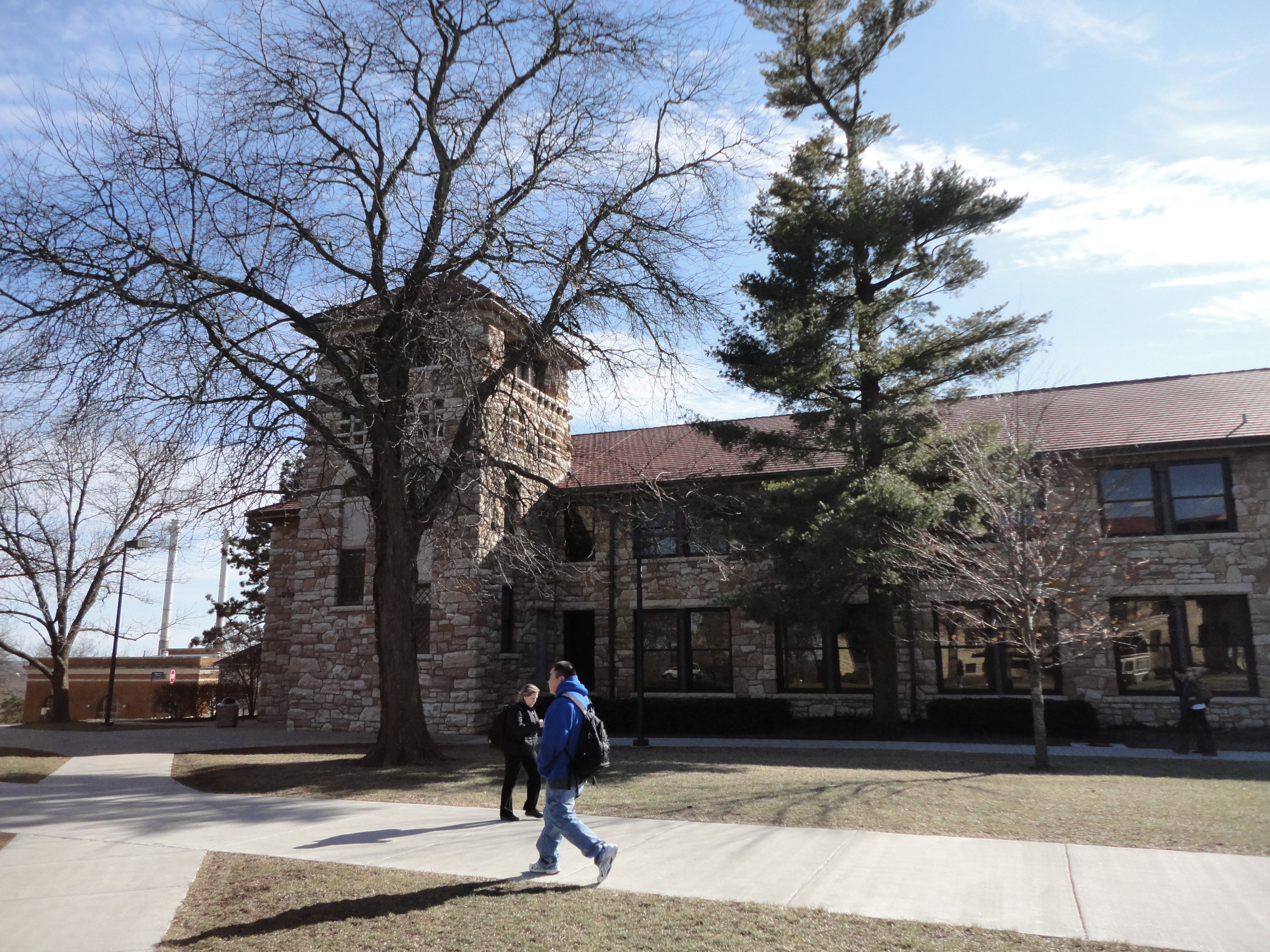
The William Allen White School of Journalism

In addition to its academic programs, the William Allen White School of Journalism and Mass Communications sponsors publications including The University Daily Kansan, Jayplay magazine, and KUJH TV.

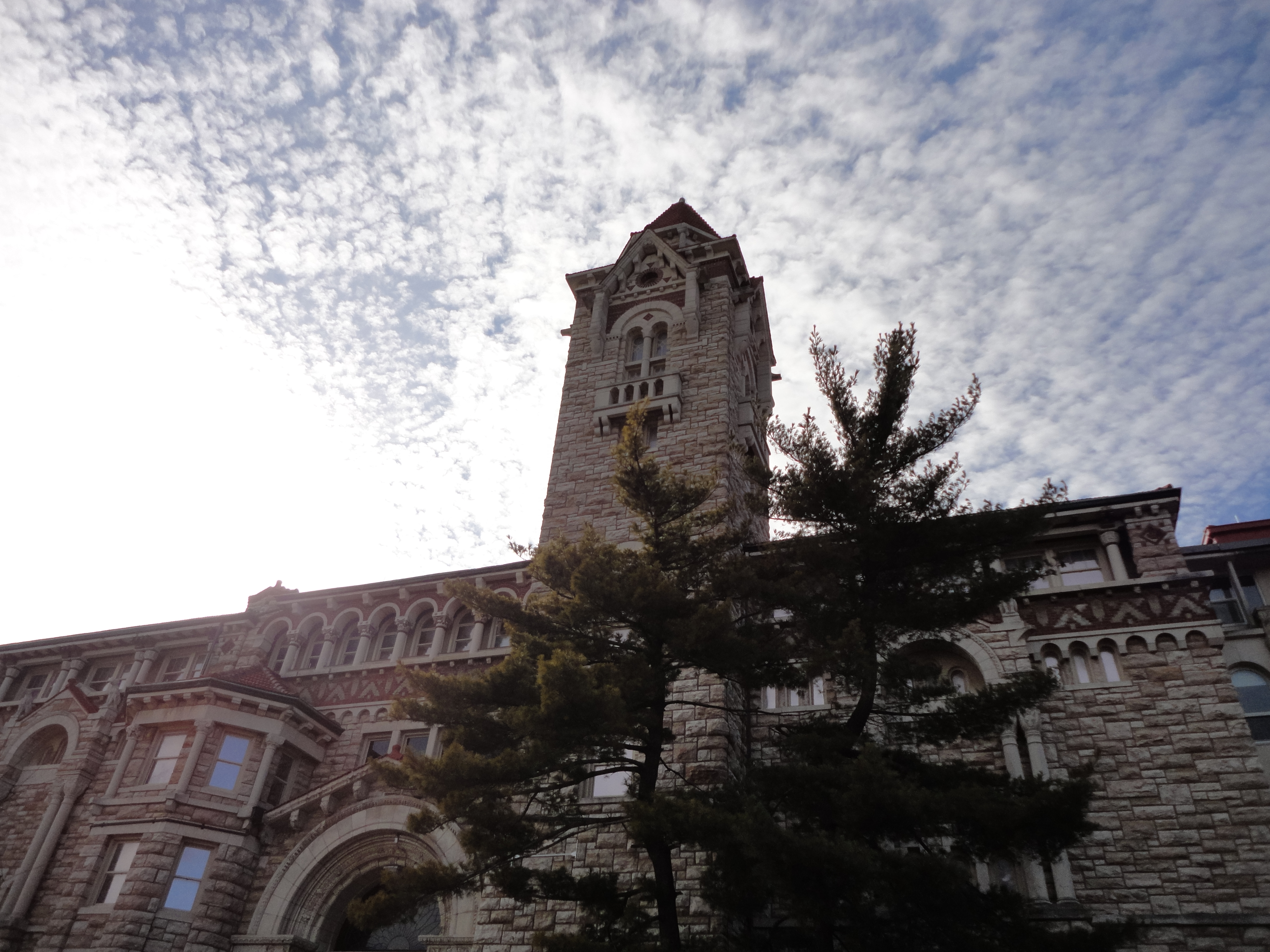
The Natural History Museum

=== Medical Center ===
The University of Kansas Medical Center features three schools: the School of Medicine, School of Nursing, and School of Health Professions that each has its own programs of graduate study. As of the Fall 2013 semester, there were 3,349 students enrolled at KU Med. The Medical Center also offers four-year instruction at the Wichita campus, and features a medical school campus in Salina, Kansas devoted to rural health care.

The University of Kansas Health System is co-located at the University of Kansas Medical Center.

=== School of Professional Studies (Edwards Campus, Overland Park) ===
KU's Edwards Campus (KUEC) is in Overland Park, Kansas. Established in 1993, its goal is to provide adults with the opportunity to complete undergraduate, graduate, and certificate programs. About 2,000 students attend the Edwards Campus, with an average age of 31. The School of Professional Studies (SPS) was formed in 2019 and is headquartered at KUEC. Many SPS programs have classes on the grounds. Other programs like Criminal Justice within SPS hold classes on the Lawrence Main Campus. Holding classes on the main campus allows for the Criminal Justice program to hold larger classes, like the popular courses like Notorious Kansas Murders and Murderers, taught by Dr. Stephen Bell or Criminal Activity Bonnie & Clyde taught by Professor Misty Campbell.

=== University of Kansas Leavenworth ===
Near the beginning of the 2018–2019 school year, KU launched classes in Leavenworth, Kansas, offering classes to "both civilian and military" students, emphasizing a "high priority in supporting military-affiliated students". The Leavenworth classes offer both undergraduate and graduate courses.

=== Computing innovations ===
KU's School of Business launched interdisciplinary management science graduate studies in operations research during Fall Semester 1965. The program provided the foundation for decision science applications supporting NASA Project Apollo Command Capsule Recovery Operations.

KU's academic computing department was an active participant in setting up the Internet and is the developer of the early Lynx text-based web browser. Lynx provided hypertext browsing and navigation prior to Tim Berners Lee's invention of HTTP and HTML.

For the 2024–2025 academic year, enrolled students had a 50th percentile SAT composite score of 1150, a 50th percentile SAT Evidence-Based Reading and Writing score of 580, and a 50th percentile SAT Math score of 570 (with 25th–75th percentile composite range not reported).

== Student activities ==
Undergraduate demographics as of Fall 2023
| Race and ethnicity | Total |
|---|---|
| White | 69% |
| Hispanic | 10% |
| Asian | 6% |
| Two or more races | 6% |
| Black | 4% |
| International student | 3% |
| Unknown | 1% |
Economic diversity
| Low-income (Note: The percentage of students who received an income-based federal Pell grant intended for low-income students.) | 20% |
| Affluent (Note: The percentage of students who are a part of the American middle class at the bare minimum.) | 80% |

=== Athletics ===
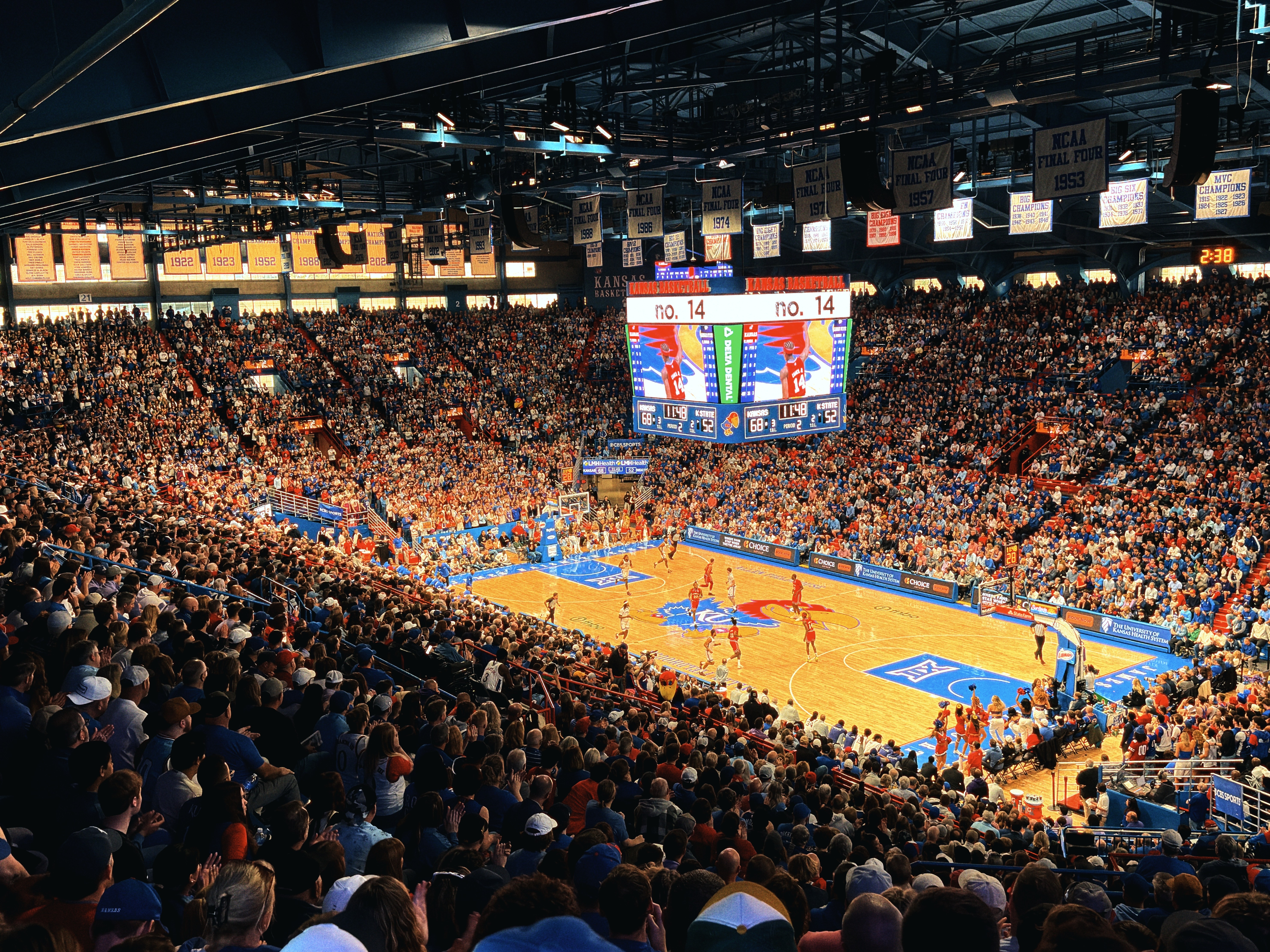
Historic Allen Fieldhouse is on the University of Kansas campus. The arena is home to the men's and women's basketball teams, currently holds the Guinness World Record for World's Loudest Indoor Arena, and is wildly regarded as one of the greatest sports venues in the world, nicknames "The Cathedral of Basketball"

The University of Kansas has had teams representing them athletically since at least 1867, a year after classes officially started. Starting in 1867, a baseball team made up of KU students represented the University of Kansas in games played at the Kansas State Fair against local teams from around the state of Kansas.

The school's sports teams, wearing crimson and blue, are called the Kansas Jayhawks. They participate in the NCAA's Division I and in the Big 12 Conference. The University of Kansas has won thirteen National Championships all-time: six in men's basketball (two Helms Foundation championships and four NCAA championships, most recently in 2022), three in men's indoor track and field, three in men's outdoor track and field, one in men's cross country and one in women's outdoor track and field. The home course for KU Cross Country is Rim Rock Farm. Their most recent championship came in 2022, the men's basketball team won the 2022 NCAA Division I men's basketball tournament.

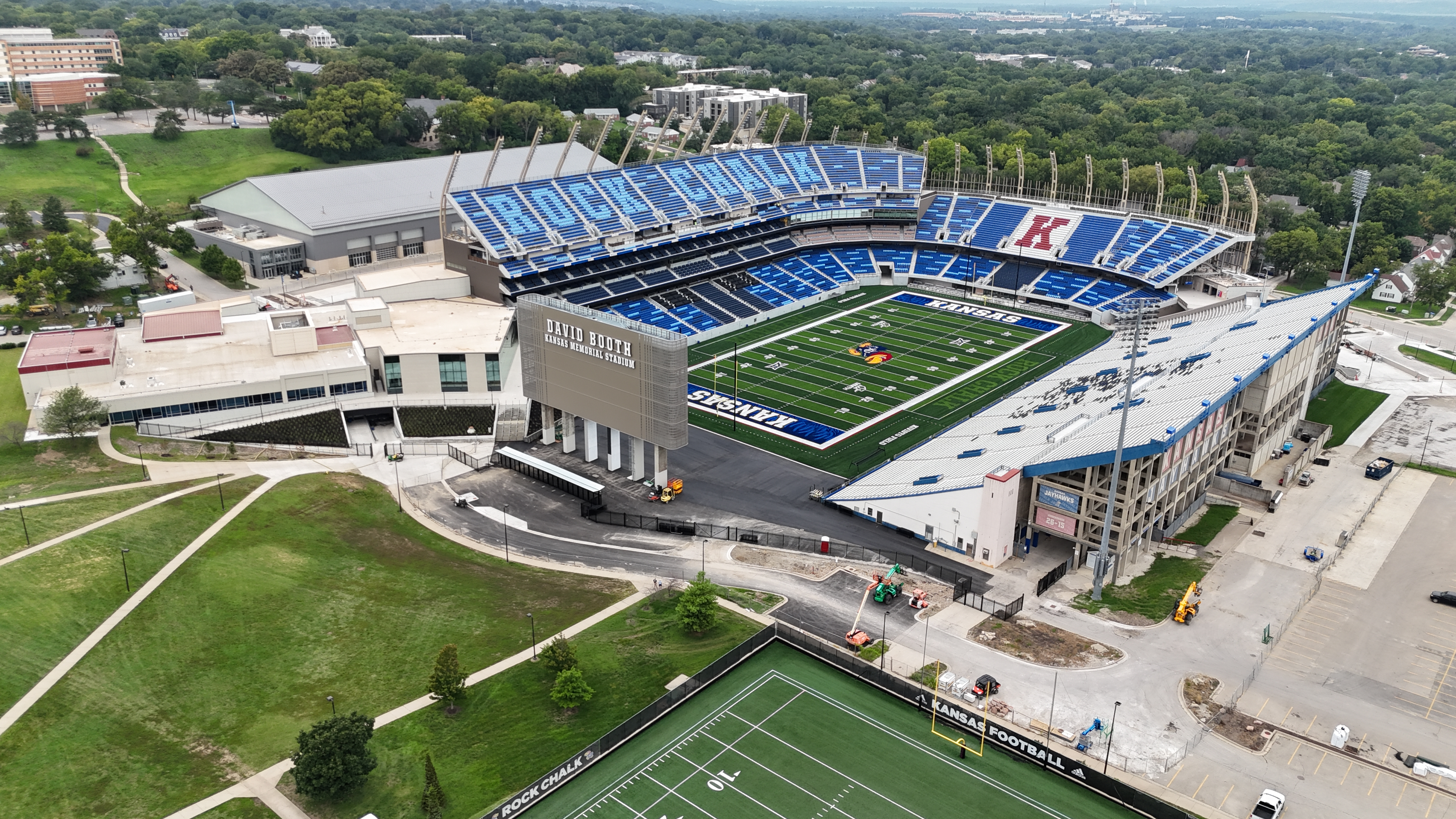
David Booth Kansas Memorial Stadium, a memorial to World War I veterans that went to KU, and home to the Kansas Jayhawks football team. The stadium is the oldest stadium west of the Mississippi River

Kansas football dates from 1890 and is one of the oldest continuous programs in the nation. They have played in the Orange Bowl three times: 1948, 1969, and 2008, as well as nine other bowl games. They are currently coached by Lance Leipold, who was hired in May 2021. From its inception in 1890 to 1929, the program saw consistent success, winning several conference titles in four different conferences. After joining the Big 6 Conference (which would eventually become the Big 8) in 1929, Kansas began to struggle in the win-loss column. With the formation of the Big 8 conference in 1960, Kansas became a consistent winner again and fielded legendary coaches like Pepper Rodgers, Don Fambrough, Bud Moore, and Glen Mason. In 2008, under the leadership of Mark Mangino, the #7 Jayhawks emerged victorious in their first BCS bowl game, the FedEx Orange Bowl, with a 24–21 victory over the #3 Virginia Tech Hokies. This capstone victory marked the end of the most successful season in school history, in which the Jayhawks went 12–1 (.923). The team plays at David Booth Kansas Memorial Stadium, which recently underwent an $85 million renovation to add an indoor practice facility with a 120-yard field, an outdoor practice facility with two full fields and three partial fields, new locker rooms, a new weight training facility, new residencies for players, new offices, new turf, new seats, and a state-of-the-art video board.

The KU men's basketball team has fielded a team every year since 1898. The Jayhawks are a perennial national contender, coached by Hall of Fame coach Bill Self. The team has won six national titles, including four NCAA tournament championships in 1952, 1988, 2008, and 2022. The basketball program is currently the winningest program in college basketball history with an overall record of 2,355–877 up to their Final Four appearance in the 2021–22 season. The team plays at Allen Fieldhouse. Perhaps its best-recognized player was Wilt Chamberlain, who played in the 1950s, later becoming an NBA star and Harlem Globetrotter.

Kansas has counted among its coaches James Naismith (the inventor of basketball), Hall of Fame inductee Phog Allen ("the Father of basketball coaching" and a Kansas alumnus himself), Dick Harp, Ted Owens, Hall of Fame inductee Roy Williams, and Hall of Fame inductee and former NBA champion Detroit Pistons coach Larry Brown. Currently, Kansas is coached by Hall of Fame inductee Bill Self. In addition, two legendary Hall of Fame coaches played for KU national championship teams under Allen—Kentucky's Adolph Rupp, who played for KU's 1922 and 1923 Helms National Championship teams, and North Carolina's Dean Smith, who played for KU's 1952 NCAA Championship team. Allen also coached Hall of Fame coaches Dutch Lonborg and Ralph Miller. Allen founded the National Association of Basketball Coaches (NABC), which started what is now the NCAA Tournament. The Tournament began in 1939 under the NABC and the next year was handed off to the NCAA.

Kansas fielded its first women's soccer team in 1995. The women's soccer team launched in 1980 as a club sport, but was promoted to varsity play in the NCAA in 1995, when Lori Walker was hired as the head coach. Since 1995 they've appeared in the NCAA tournament ten times, and have won the Big 12 championship three times. They compete at Rock Chalk Park, a 2,500-seat stadium built in 2014. In cooperation with Kansas Athletics, FIFA used Rock Chalk Park as a training facility and team base camp for the 2026 FIFA World Cup, with one of the host sites being nearby Kansas City.

Notable non-varsity sports include rugby, men's hockey, and men's soccer. The rugby team owns its private facility and tours internationally every two years. The men's hockey team plays at AdventHealth Sports Park in Overland Park, Kansas. They also practice in Topeka and Lawrence. They compete in the American Collegiate Hockey Association. Men's soccer competes in the South Conference of the Upper Midwest Collegiate Soccer League. They play on an artificial turf field next to student dorms next to Allen Fieldhouse.

=== Debate teams ===
The University of Kansas has had more teams compete in the National Debate Tournament than any other university. Kansas has won the tournament six times (1954, 1970, 1976, 1983, 2009, and 2018) and has qualified to the Final Four 22 times. Kansas trails only Northwestern (15) and Harvard (7) for most tournaments won and is tied with Dartmouth (6). Kansas also won the Copeland Award in 1981–82, 2017–18, and 2024–2025.

=== Media ===
The university's newspaper is the University Daily Kansan, which placed first in the Intercollegiate Writing Competition of the prestigious William Randolph Hearst Writing Foundation competition. In the winter of 2008, a group of students created KUpedia, a wiki about all things KU. They received student funding for operations in 2008–09. The KU Department of English publishes the Coal City Review, an annual literary journal of prose, poetry, reviews, and illustrations. The Review typically features the work of many writers, but periodically spotlights one author, as in the case of 2006 Nelson Poetry Book Award-winner Voyeur Poems by Matthew Porubsky.

The University Daily Kansan operates outside of the university's William Allen White School of Journalism and reaches at least 30,000 daily readers through its print and online publications.

The university houses the following public broadcasting stations: KJHK, a student-run campus radio station, KUJH-LP, an independent station that primarily broadcasts public affairs programs, and KANU, the NPR-affiliated radio station. Kansas Public Radio station KANU was one of the nation's first public radio stations. KJHK, the campus radio has roots back to 1952 and is completely run by students.

== Center for Community Health and Development ==
The university's Center for Community Health and Development (formerly KU Work Group) was designated as a World Health Organization Collaborating Centre for Community Health and Development in 2004. It is affiliated with the Department of Applied Behavioral Science and the Schiefelbusch Institute for Life Span Studies at the university, and supports community health and development through a variety of means, including its free online resource, the Community Tool Box.

== Foundations ==
=== University of Kansas Memorial Corporation ===
The first union was built on campus in 1926 as a campus community center. The unions are still the "living rooms" of campus and include three locations – the Kansas Union and Burge Union at the Lawrence Campus and Jayhawk Central at the Edwards Campus. The KU Memorial Unions Corporation manages the KU Bookstore (with seven locations). The KU Bookstore is the official bookstore of KU. The corporation also includes KU Dining Services, with more than 20 campus locations, including The Market (inside the Kansas Union) and The Underground (located in Wescoe Hall). The KU Bookstore and KU Dining Services are not-for-profit, with proceeds supporting student programs, such as Student Union Activities.

=== KU Endowment ===
KU Endowment was established in 1891 as the university's primary institutional foundation to manage and build the university's endowment.

== Notable alumni and faculty ==
Affiliated with the university as students, researchers, or faculty members have been 325 Fulbright Scholars, 27 Rhodes Scholars, 10 Marshall Scholars, two Mitchell Scholars, 12 MacArthur Fellows, 7 Pulitzer Prize winners, 5 NASA astronauts, 2 Nobel Prize laureates, 3 Hugo Award or Nebula Award winners, and 2 Academy Award winners.

Additionally, two people associated with the school have been awarded the Presidential Medal of Freedom. Dean Smith, who played basketball at Kansas from 1949 to 1953 and was a Hall of Fame men's basketball coach at the University of North Carolina at Chapel Hill, was given the award by Barack Obama in 2013. Politician Bob Dole, who played football and basketball at the school but did not graduate, was given the Presidential Medal of Freedom award by Bill Clinton in 1997.

== See also ==
- Bailey Hall (University of Kansas)
- Budig Hall
- Kansas Audio-Reader Network
- Kansas Crew (University Rowing Club)
- "Kansas Song"
- "Home on the Range"
- University of Kansas Marching Jayhawks
