= Paula Caligiuri =

American psychologist and author

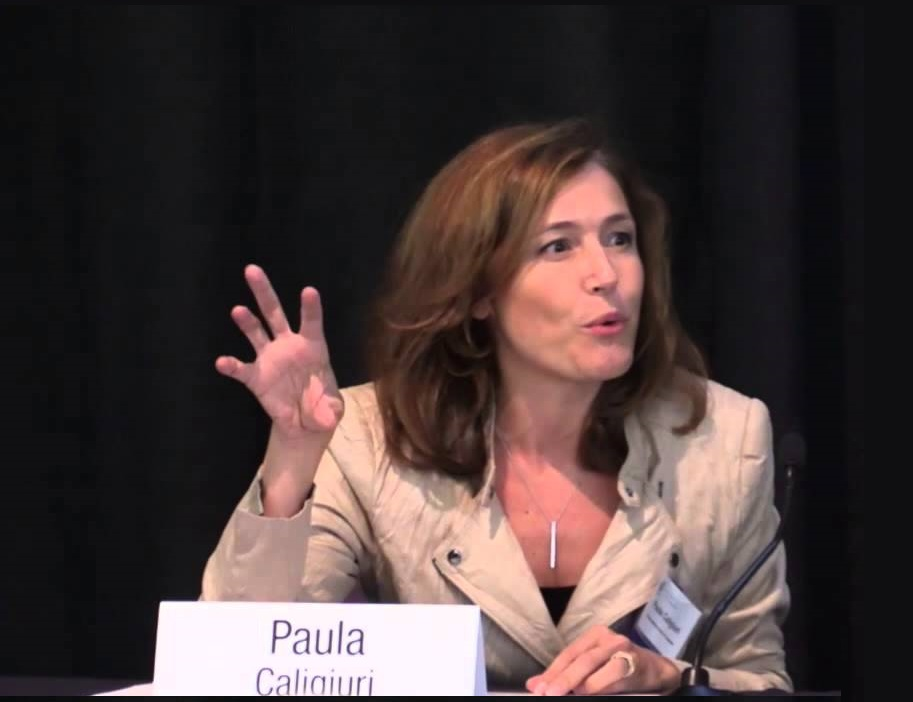
- Education: Canisius College (BA); Pennsylvania State University (MS, PhD)
- Occupations: Psychologist, academic

Paula Caligiuri is an American academic, talent management specialist, psychologist, book author, and entrepreneur. As a Distinguished Professor of international business and strategy, she is on the faculty at D'Amore-McKim School of Business, Northeastern University. Her published contributions in the field of international human resource management have won academic distinctions, and been endorsed in scholarly literature and in wider professional circles. Among her books, Get a Life, Not a Job, Managing the Global Workforce, Cultural Agility: Building a Pipeline of Successful Global Professionals, and Build Your Cultural Agility: The Nine Competencies of Successful Global Professionals, received attention by qualified media. In 2023, she wrote Live for a Living: How to Create your Career Journey to Work Happier, Not Harder with Andrew Palmer (Technologist), which focuses on career development. She is ranked # 392 among the best business and management scientists in the US, 810 worldwide. Her most recent research expands her coined term cultural agility into the concept of contextual agility, a term also related to soft skills. She also theorized on the need to embrace complexity in order to balance the effects of innovative business disruption.

== Education ==
Caligiuri earned a BA degree in Psychology from Canisius College (Buffalo, NY) in 1989. She attained MS and PhD degrees in Industrial/Organizational Psychology from Pennsylvania State University in 1992 and 1995, respectively.

== Career ==
From 1995 to 2013, Caligiuri was a professor at the School of Management and Labor Relations, Rutgers University. Between 2003 and 2006, Caligiuri was a visiting professor at Bocconi University (Milan). From 2013, she has been a Distinguished Professor of International Business & Strategy at the D'Amore-McKim School of Business of Northeastern University, Boston, MA. At Northeastern, from 2015 she is also the Director and Founder of the Cultural Agility Leadership Lab.

Caligiuri is a fellow member of the Academy of International Business, the American Psychological Association, and the Society for Industrial and Organizational Psychology, where she is a member of its Visionary Circle. She is also a member of the Academy of Management.

Caligiuri has served as an Editorial Review Board member of Cross Cultural & Strategic Management, an area editor the Journal of International Business Studies, a Senior Editor of the Journal of World Business, and an Associate Editor of the International Journal of Human Resource Management. She has also been an ad hoc reviewer of the International Journal of Selection and Assessment, and a Special Issue Editor of the Journal of International Business Studies. She has been a book reviewer within her areas of expertise. Her editorial on the implications of the COVID-19 pandemic on HRM research and practice has been thoroughly cited.

She has been a keynote speaker on Cultural agility at many international events, and offers LinkedIn Learning online courses on the subject. In June 2021, she was interviewed by Jill Griffin on Forbes about "the science of working with different cultures". Other written interviews are available online.

Caligiuri opines on cultural agility and related matters at various sites. She has repeatedly appeared on TV, fulfilling roles as a consulting expert in career development, or as a show host and interviewer. Her podcast interview by Josh Friedman, and her talk at the 20th Human Resource Management Conference (Paris, 2020) are available online.

She is the host of the podcast "International Business Today", where she has hosted dozens of interviews to notable people such as professors Phillip A. Sharp (geneticist), George Yip (economist) , and Michael Posner (lawyer). As an entrepreneur she founded Skiilify, a public benefit corporation dedicated to helping everyone build their soft skills, including cultural agility.

In 2026, she was conferred the Outstanding Educator Award by the AOM International Management Division.

== Work ==
=== Research topics ===
Research articles where Caligiuri is an author will be found in current entries on cultural agility, cross-cultural competence, ethnocentrism, expatriate, globalization, international assignment, international student, global leadership, talent management, and workforce management.

=== Papers ===
According to Google scholar, Caligiuri's academic articles have been cited 14,517 times, with an overall h-index of 52 (Oct 16, 2022). Her most cited articles are:

- Caligiuri, P. M., Hyland, M., Joshi, A., & Bross, A. (1998). A theoretical framework for examining the relationship between family adjustment and expatriate adjustment to working in the host country. Journal of Applied Psychology, 83(4), 598–614. Cited 538 times.
- Caligiuri, P. M. (2000). The big five personality characteristics as predictors of expatriate's desire to terminate the assignment and supervisor‐rated performance. Personnel psychology, 53(1), 67–88. Cited 987 times.
- Caligiuri, P. M. (2000). Selecting expatriates for personality characteristics: A moderating effect of personality on the relationship between host national contact and cross-cultural adjustment. MIR: Management International Review, 61–80. Cited 763 times.
- Caligiuri, P., Phillips, J., Lazarova, M., Tarique, I., & Burgi, P. (2001). The theory of met expectations applied to expatriate adjustment: The role of crosscultural training. International Journal of Human Resource Management, 12(3), 357–372. Cited 507 times.

=== Recent opinion ===
- Caligiuri, P. (2021), "How organisations can build cultural agility", People Management, May 19, 2021
- Caligiuri, P., (2021), "Reclaiming Culture After 'The Great Reset", Chief Executive, June 23, 2021
- Caligiuri, P. (2022), "Why cultural agility is the antidote to ineffective EDI programmes, part one" January 20, 2022, HR Magazine

=== Books ===
- Poelmans, S. & Caligiuri, P. (2008). Harmonizing Work, Family, and Personal Life in Organizations, Cambridge University Press. ISBN 978-0521858694. Repeatedly cited by peers.
- Caligiuri, P. (2010). Get a Life, Not a Job: Do What You Love and Let Your Talents Work for You. FT Press. ISBN 978-0137058495. Named one of the 2010 top 10 career books by Kerry Hannon from Forbes. Favorably reviewed in several sources.
- Caligiuri, P., Lepak, D., & Bonache, J. (2010). Global Dimensions of Human Resources Management: Managing the Global Workforce, Wiley Publishing. ISBN 978-1405107327. Repeatedly cited in academic literature.
- Caligiuri, P. (2012). Cultural Agility: Building a Pipeline of Globally Successful Professionals. Jossey-Bass Publishing. ISBN 978-1118275078. Cited in articles and subject reviews.
- Collings, D., Wood, G., and Caligiuri, P. (eds.) (2015) The Routledge Companion to International Human Resource Management. Routledge. ISBN 978-0415636049. Cited by many scholarly articles.
- Collings, D., Scullion, H., and Caligiuri, P. (eds.) (2019) Global Talent Management. Routledge. ISBN 978-1138712454. Cited by many articles and reviews on human resource management.
- Caligiuri, P. (2021). Build Your Cultural Agility: The Nine Competencies of Successful Global Professionals. Kogan-Page Publishing, ISBN 978-1789666618.
- Caligiuri, Paula; Palmer, Andy (October 5, 2023). Live for a Living. Fast Company Press. ISBN 978-1-63908-085-4 Reviewed in Foreword Reviews. Co-author Andy Palmer is a technologist and entrepreneur based in Massachusetts. The book was favorably reviewed by Sarah Frideswide, and Tal E. Gur.

=== Book chapters ===
She has written dozens of book chapters, some of which may be reached on ResearchGate.

== Distinctions ==
In 2008, a research article authored jointly by Stahl, Chua, Caligiuri and others was listed 2nd among the best papers in International Human Resource Management by the Academy of Management. In 2012, her article authored jointly with Ibraiz Tarique was given the Best Article Award by the Global Leadership Advancement Center. In 2016 Caligiuri was the recipient of the Applied Science Award 2016, Institute for Cross-Cultural Management (Florida Institute of Technology). In 2017, Caligiuri was named one of the most prolific authors in the field of Expatriate Management. In 2019 she was awarded silver medal for Scholarship by the Journal of International Business Studies. In 2020, she was named Fellow of the Academy of International Business.
