= National CBRN Defence Centre =

Swedish joint national centre for CBRN defence

Coordinates: 63°50′14″N 20°15′14″E

- Totalförsvarets skyddscentrum
- Coat of arms.
- Active: 1953–present
- Country: Sweden
- Allegiance: Swedish Armed Forces
- Branch: Joint
- Role: Develop and educate CBRN defense
- Size: Company (Career officers: 64. Non-combatant employee: 15. Group commanders, soldiers and sailors: 23)
- Garrison/HQ: Stockholm (1953–1970); Kungsängen (1970–1992); Umeå (1992–)
- Colors: Green and white
- March: Nordsalut (Lundqvist) (Note: The march was adopted in 1992 by the ABC-Defence School of the [Swedish] Total Defence (Totalförsvarets skyddsskola) and was established by the Chief of the Army on 16 June 1993. On 27 November 2002, the march was established for the National CBRN Defence Centre.)

Commanders
- Current commander: Colonel Joakim Eriksson

The National CBRN Defence Centre (Swedish: Totalförsvarets skyddscentrum, SkyddC, lit. 'Total Defense Protection Center') is a Swedish military unit with expertise regarding chemical, biological, radiological and nuclear defense used by both the army, marines and the air force. The unit has been existing in different forms since 1953. Totalförsvarets skyddscentrum is localised together with Västerbottensgruppen (UG 61) within Umeå Garrison (also known as Umestan), which is the barracks that previously were used by Västerbotten Regiment.

== History ==
The center has its origin from the gas technicians who were employed in the Swedish Armed Forces in the 1930s. In 1953 the Army ABC-Defence School (Arméns skyddskola) was formed within Swedish Infantry Combat School (InfSS) in Rosersberg. When InfSS was moved to Linköping the "Skyddskola" was transferred to Svea Life Guards (I 1), with had its former location at Ulriksdal.

In 1968 the school received new tasks and the name was changed to ABC-Defence School of the Armed Forces (Försvarets skyddsskola). 1970 moved the school along with the Svea Life Guards to Kungsängen. On 1 July 1988 the school was separated from the Svea Life Guards, and received new tasks with a focus on Totalförsvaret, with this organizational change, the school changed the name to ABC-Defence School of the Total Defence (Totalförsvarets skyddsskola).

After that the parliament voted for the Government Bill 1987/88: 112, it was decided that the school would be relocated in 1992 to Umeå Garrison.

On 27 July 2009 the last batch of conscripts started their training. Their training took place at Swea kompani at the National CBRN Defence Centre (Totalförsvarets skyddscentrum). These were later to be discharge at the 17 June 2010.

Most of the Swedish CBRN expertise is now gathered in Umeå, where SkyddC since autumn 2008 is part of a network that is part of the European CBRNE Center, including the Swedish Defence Research Agency (FOI), Umeå University, Västerbotten County Council and Umeå Municipality.

The Swedish government decided in late 2010 to expand the CBRN focus with an indoor facility at SkyddC. This is to increase the safety of the training with CBRN material. In total around 80 million was to be invested in the facility.

== Heraldry and traditions ==
=== Colours, standards and guidons ===
The unit colour was presented to the then ABC-Defence School of the [Swedish] Total Defence (Totalförsvarets skyddsskola, SkyddS) at the Artillery Square in Stockholm by the Supreme Commander, general Owe Wiktorin on 30 April 1996. It is drawn by Bengt Olof Kälde and embroidered by machine in insertion technique by the company Libraria. Blazon: "On white cloth a rampant green dragon, armed red."

=== Coat of arms ===
The coat of arms of the Swedish Army ABC/NBC-Defence School 1953–1968 and the ABC-Defence School of the Swedish Armed Forces 1979–1988. Blazon: "Argent, a dragon rampant vert, armed and langued gules. The shield surmounting two swords in saltire or".

The coat of arms of the ABC-Defence School of the Swedish Total Defence 1988–2000 and the National CBRN Defence Centre from 2000. Blazon: "Argent, a dragon rampant vert, armed and langued gules. The shield surmounting an erect sword or".

Coat of the arms used 1953–1968 and 1979–1988.

Coat of arms used 1988–2000 and 2000–present.

=== Medals ===
In 2012, the Totalförsvarets skyddscentrums förtjänstmedalj (SkyddCGM/SM) of the 8th size in gold/silver was established.

== Commanding officers ==
- 1952–1956: Major Svante Johan Millqvist
- 1956–1960: Major Malgerud
- 1960–1963: Major Sigvard Månsson
- 1963–1965: Lieutenant Colonel Ingemar Grunditz
- 1965–1967: Lieutenant Colonel Hans von Schreeb
- 1967–1977: Lieutenant Colonel Hans Carlsson
- 1977–1982: Lieutenant Colonel Sigfrid Tellqvist
- 1982–1992: Lieutenant Colonel Ingemar Björnsson
- 1992–1993: Colonel Per-Erik Ritzén
- 1993–1995: Colonel Gustaf Djurlin
- 1995–2004: Colonel Dick Stode
- 2004–2012: Colonel Gunnar Söderström
- 2012–2017: Colonel Jan Demarkesse (previously Jan Johansson)
- 2017–2018: Lieutenant Colonel Michael Magnesten (acting)
- 2018–2022: Colonel Stefan Jansson
- 2022–2023: Lieutenant Colonel Joakim Ericson (acting)
- 2023–2023: Colonel Thomas Lamke
- 2023–2023: Lieutenant Colonel Henrik Mattsson (acting)
- 2023–2026: Colonel Thomas Lamke
- 2026-07-01 – present: Colonel Joakim Eriksson

== Names, designations and locations ==
Name	Translation	From		To
Arméns skyddsskola	[Swedish] Army ABC-Defence School [Swedish] Army NBC Defense School	1953-06-01	–	1968-06-30
Försvarets skyddsskola	ABC-Defence School of the [Swedish] Armed Forces	1968-07-01	–	1988-06-30
Totalförsvarets skyddsskola	ABC-Defence School of the [Swedish] Total Defence	1988-07-01	–	2000-06-30
Totalförsvarets skyddscentrum	National CBRN Defence Centre; National NBC-Defence Centre	2000-07-01	–	
Designation		From		To
SkyddS		1953-06-01	–	2000-06-30
SkyddC		2000-07-01	–	
Location		From		To
Stockholm Garrison		1953-04-04	–	1961-05-16
Rosersberg		1953-05-17	–	1961-02-15
Sörentorp		1961-02-16	–	1970-05-04
Kungsängen Garrison		1970-05-05	–	1992-06-30
Umeå Garrison		1992-07-01	–	
