= Simon L. Dolan =

Jewish professor of organizational psychology and human resource

- שמעון דולן
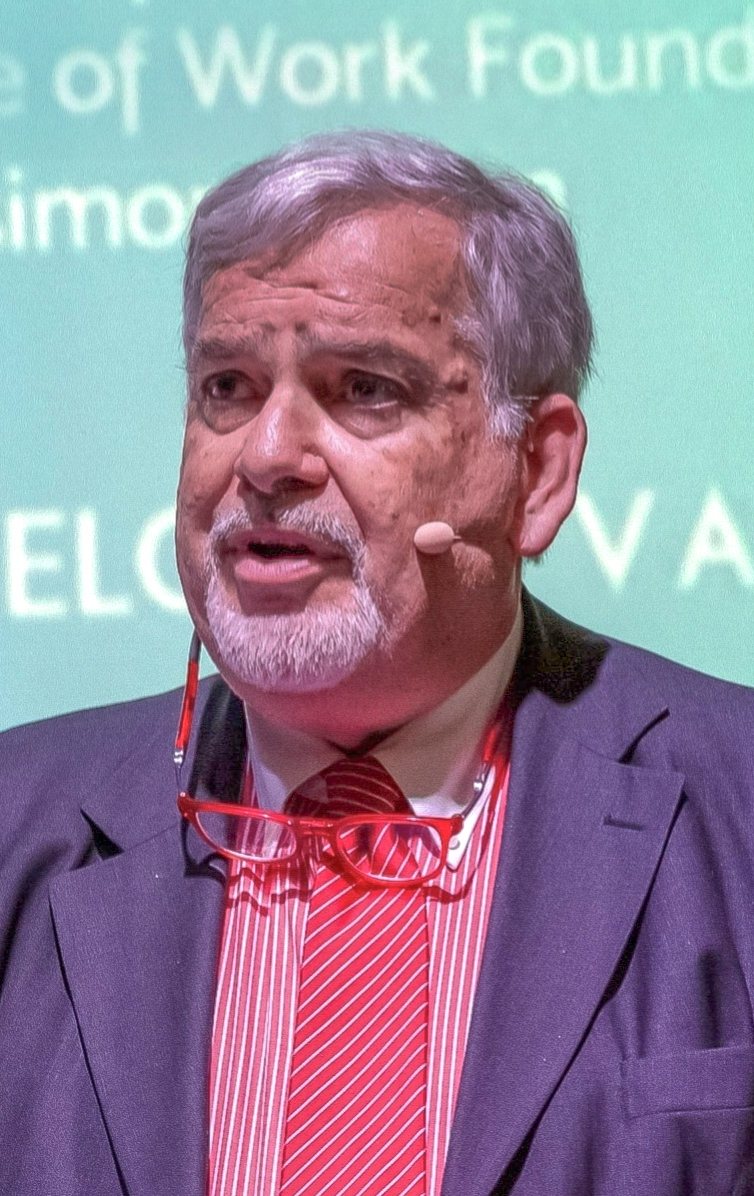
- Born: 1947 (age 78–79); Tel Aviv, Israel
- Education: Tel Aviv University, University of Minnesota
- Scientific career
- Fields: Organizational psychology, Human resource management
- Workplaces: Advantere School of Management, ESADE Business School, McGill University, University of Montreal
- Website: www.simondolan.com

Simon L. Dolan (Hebrew: שמעון דולן; born 1947) is an academic and researcher at the Advantere School of Management, Comillas Pontifical University and Georgetown University. He served as a professor at McGill University, University of Montreal, and ESADE Business School where he held the "future of work" chair.

Dolan's research work focuses on organizational psychology and human resource management. He is also the President of the Global Future of Work Foundation.

== Early life and education ==
Dolan was born to Holocaust survivors, David and Lola, and grew up in Beit Eshel, and later in Ness Ziona. He studied at Tel Aviv University and graduated in 1971.

While studying for an accredited degree, he moved to the University of Minnesota, in the United States and continued his studies in the doctoral program. He graduated with a master's degree in 1976 in organizational psychology and human resource management.

His doctoral thesis was completed in 1977 under the supervision of Prof. Richard Hall and Prof. John Campbell.

== Academic career ==
Dolan was a professor at McGill University and the University of Montreal, between 1978 and 2002. He was a guest lecturer at Boston University, University of Colorado Boulder, ESSEC Business School in Paris (France), University of Cádiz, Pablo de Olavide University in Seville (Spain) and Tel Aviv University.

Between 2001 and 2020, he served as a full professor at ESADE Business School (University Ramon Llull). He also served as the head of the Institute for Labor Studies, and later, as the "future of work" chair at the same institution.

In 2022 he was appointed full professor and senior researcher at the Advantere School of Management in Madrid.

== Research ==
=== Managing by values ===
Dolan developed the management model acronymed "Managing by values", which deals with shaping organizational culture through the identification of its most important shared values. The model identifies three axes of values: Ethical, Economic and Emotional-developmental in a triaxial structure.

In this model, the value of trust was identified as the "value of values" (mega-value) which is a central axis for maintaining a balanced and sustainable healthy organization. Similarly, it applies to sustain effective leadership and a work-family balance.

=== Stress and burnout management ===
Dolan also developed the "Chronic Stress Management" model, which eventually led to the development of a diagnostic tool acronym: The Stress Map. The latter deals with mapping the sources of stress (in work and non-work contexts), the modulating variables, consequences in terms of signs (physiological and biological) and symptoms (psychological and somatic) measured by a new algorithm called density (frequency multiplied by severity). This diagnostic tool is based on the principles of gamification.

== Professional work outside universities ==
In 1978 Dolan founded an international consulting corporation in the field of value-based human resource management, Gestión MDS Management Inc. The company has offices in Montreal (Canada) and Rabat (Morocco). In 2017 he co-founded the e-Merit Academy (along with Prof. Mario Raich from Zurich). The academy is dedicated to developing managers in the era of globalization, digital and cyber-age.

Dolan serves as the president and academic director of the "Center for Management and Training by Values" in Israel, which is a satellite office of Gestion MDS Inc.

He is also president of a Spanish values training center ZINQUO, and CEO of a technological venture called myDova.

== Publications ==
Dolan published over 85 books, many of which were translated into several languages.

=== Selected books ===
- Dolan et al.: (2006) Managing by Values: A Corporate Guide to Living, being alive and making a living in the XXI Century (Palgrave-MacMillan)
- Dolan S.L., (2017) Stress, Self-Esteem, Health and Work (Palgrave-MacMillan)
- Dolan S.L. (2011) Coaching by Values: How to succeed in the life of business and the business of life (iUniverse)
- Dolan S.L. and Kawamura K., (2015) Cross-Cultural Competence: A Field Guide for Developing Global Leaders and Managers (Emerald publishing)
- Dolan S.L. (2021) The Secret of Coaching and Leading by Values: How to Ensure Alignment and Proper Realignment (Routledge)
- Dolan S.L. (2023) De-Stress at Work: Understanding and Combating Chronic Stress (Routledge)

He is also the author of more than 170 academic publications. He was a member of the editorial board of several scientific journals, and editor-in-chief of Emerald's Cross Cultural & Strategic Management.

== Personal life ==
Dolan is a father of two. He is married to Adela Maldonado.

Simon's younger brother, Avishai Landau, also graduated with a master's degree in the Department of Labor Studies at Tel Aviv University.
