= Stefan Jansson (army officer) =

Swedish army officer (born 1967)

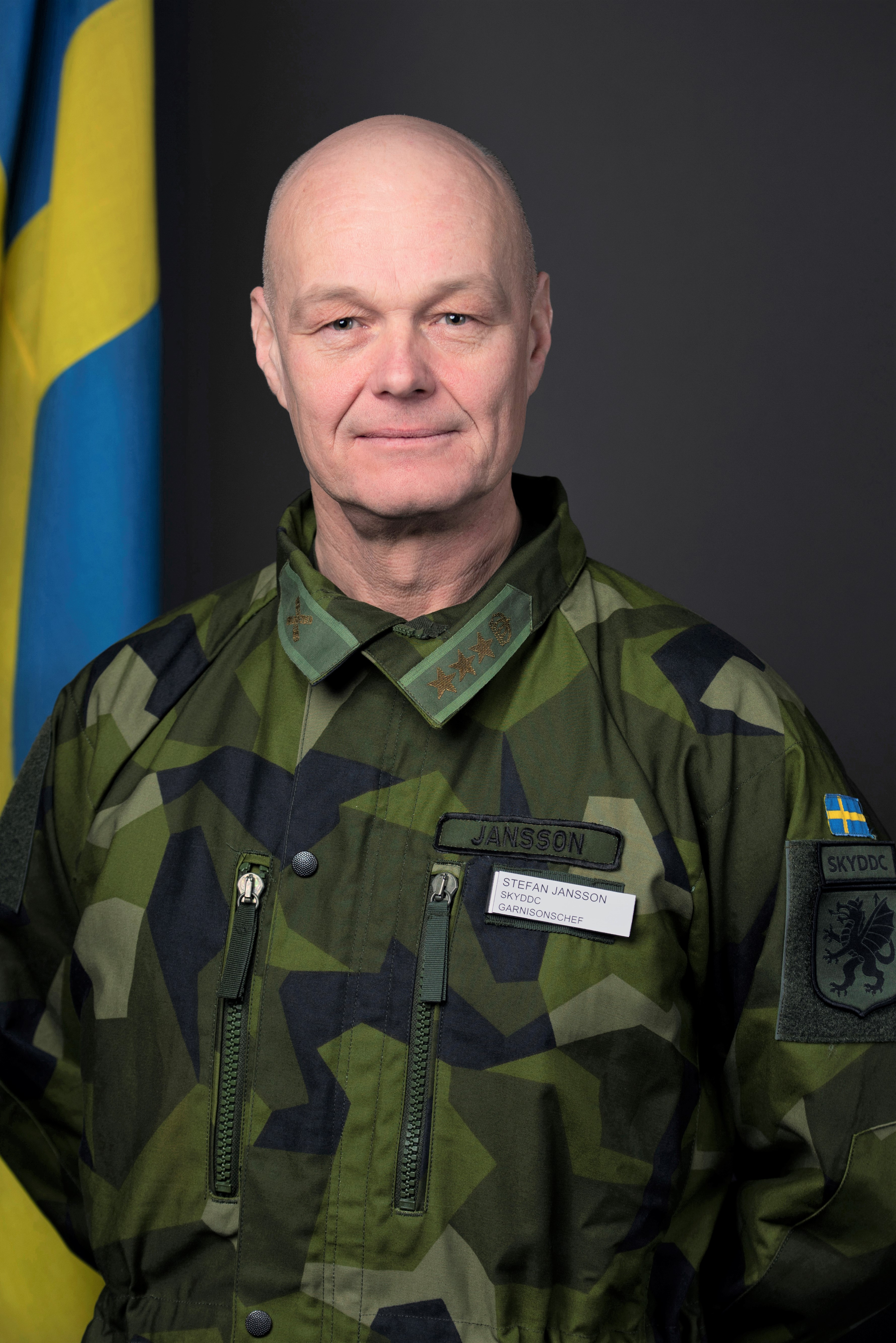
- Jansson in 2021
- Born: Erik Stefan Jansson; 13 September 1967 (age 59); Säffle, Sweden
- Military career
- Allegiance: Sweden
- Branch: Swedish Army
- Service years: 1991–present
- Rank: Colonel
- Commands: Army Staff
- Wars: War in Afghanistan (2001–2021)

Colonel Erik Stefan Jansson (born 13 September 1967) is a Swedish Army officer.

== Career ==
Early in his career, Jansson held NATO-related positions in Belgium, where he and his family experienced heightened security measures following several terrorist attacks in Europe. He has emphasized the importance of risk awareness in such roles and has advocated for involving family members in discussions when accepting international assignments, particularly in connection with his earlier deployment to Afghanistan.

As commander of the National CBRN Defence Centre in Umeå from 2018 to 2022, Jansson was responsible for training conscripts in protection against chemical, biological, radiological, and nuclear threats. He noted that the selection process often favoured individuals with strong academic backgrounds in science, and that mental resilience was more important than physical strength for the role. During his leadership, the number of conscripts at the centre grew significantly as part of Sweden's broader military expansion.

Jansson has also expressed appreciation for Sweden's gender-neutral conscription system, stating that it enables selection from the entire age group rather than only from among males, resulting in a more capable armed force. He has advocated for increased investment in the army, citing Sweden's advanced defence capabilities and warning that the country may face future hybrid threats, particularly in strategically important areas such as Gotland.

== Decorations ==
- (Sweden) For Zealous and Devoted Service of the Realm
- (Sweden) Swedish Armed Forces Conscript Medal
- (Sweden) Swedish Armed Forces International Service Medal
- (Sweden) Värmland Brigade Medal of Merit
- (Sweden) Artillery Regiment Medal of Merit
- NATO Non-Article 5 medal for ISAF

== Sources ==
- Wynne, Anders (14 January 2020). "Översten i Umeå tacksam för att tjejer också får göra värnplikten". Västerbottens-Kuriren (in Swedish).
- Jakobsson, Torbjörn (6 April 2020). "Umepodden: Översten om det politiska säkerhetsläget". Västerbottens-Kuriren (in Swedish).

Military offices
Preceded by Michael Magnesten	Chief of the National CBRN Defence Centre; 2018–2022	Succeeded by Joakim Ericson
Preceded by Dag Lidén	Chief of the Army Staff; 2022–2026	Succeeded by Dan Rasmussen
