= Cultural agility =

Management term

Cultural agility is a term employed in talent management to design a complex competency based on skills whose command allows an individual or an organization to perform successfully in cross-cultural situations. Cultural agility has been conceptualized as an individual's ability to comfortably and effectively work in different cultures (e.g., countries, organizations) and with people from different cultures, national origins, generations, gender, etc. People with cultural agility are able to "build trust, gain credibility, communicate, and collaborate effectively across cultures". The concept appears to overlap with others such as cross-cultural competence and cultural intelligence. The subject has been linked to studying abroad, foreign talent acquisition, immigrants and refugees, career success, sports coaching, leadership development, and global business. Currently, the term is often associated with research carried out by Paula Caligiuri, and a few others like Marisa Cleveland, and Zeinab Shawky Younis. On psychological aspects, the command of cultural agility resources may be facilitated by personality traits like extraversion, openness, and predisposition to novelty seeking, but also by appropriate learning. Self-assessment has been pointed out as a practical approach to evaluate the level of competence reached by cultural agility trainees.

== History ==
Apart from its colloquial use, the term agility was proposed as a relevant concept to industry and business management in the 1990s by Steven L. Goldman, who published a volume on the subject. An early use of the full term (cultural agility) is found in a series of conferences by Terry Lee named "Leadership for the New Millennium", in 1999.

In recent times, the concept has been amply developed by Paula Caligiuri from Northeastern University and her co-authors, through many academic articles and books, now being widely used in academic literature. Other authors publishing books on agility as a main subject include Peter Gillies from TIAS School for Business and Society (Tilburg, Netherlands), and Guy Morrow, from the University of Melbourne, Australia.

Beyond academic circles, the term has gained popularity in mass media when commenting about the need for acquisition of intercultural skills to achieve adequate inclusion in the socioeconomic workings of an increasingly globalized world, among them thosed often termed 'soft skills'. A Cultural Agility Collaboration Group has been established by the University of Minnesota to facilitate developing inclusive, equitable, socially just spaces in campuses, and local communities.

== Digitalization ==
Digital technologies facilitate communication across cultures, and help overcome language barriers to some extent.

== Localization ==
Although adapting business practices to local cultural preferences may seem generally appropriate, detailed assessment of circumstances may reveal overall benefits from the use of countercultural practices on some occasions.

== Training ==
Opportunities to learn cultural agility theory and/or techniques appear to be growing through:

- Self-assessment, and e-learning.
- Organizational courses
- Inclusion of CA themes and courses in university syllabuses
- Ad-hoc programs for personnel sectors
