= Andrew Palmer (technologist) =

American technologist, Internet entrepreneur, and investor

- Born: June 17, 1966 (age 60)
- Other name: Andy Palmer
- Citizenship: United States
- Education: Bowdoin College, Dartmouth College
- Occupations: Technologist & Internet entrepreneur
- Employer: Tamr
- Known for: Co-founding Vertica; co-founder of Tamr; founder of Koa Labs, former global head of software and data engineering at Novartis Institutes for BioMedical Research
- Title: CEO & Co-Founder

Andrew Palmer (born 17 June 1966) is an American technologist, Internet entrepreneur, and investor.

== Biography ==
Andrew Palmer is CEO and co-founder of the data analytics company Tamr and founder of Koa Labs, a seed fund for first-time entrepreneurs. Previously he was co-founder of database software company Vertica with computer scientist Michael Stonebraker. Vertica was successfully acquired by Hewlett-Packard in March 2011.

Earlier in his career he served as Global Head of Software and Data Engineering at Novartis Institutes for BioMedical Research (NIBR) and as a member of the start-up team and Chief Information and Administrative Officer at Infinity Pharmaceuticals. Additionally, he has held positions at Bowstreet, pcOrder.com, and Trilogy.

He earned undergraduate degrees in English, history and computer science from Bowdoin College, and an MBA from the Tuck School of Business at Dartmouth. In 2023 Palmer co-authored the book Live for A Living with Paula Caligiuri, which focuses on career development.

== Awards and recognition ==
Entrepreneur Of The Year 2020 New England by Ernst & Young

Boston Globe Tech Power Players 50

New England Venture Capital Association Angel Investor of the Year

Patent: Data curation system with version control for workflow states and provenance
