= Ordnance Corps (Ireland) =

Irish Army Ordnance Corps
- Irish: An Cór Ordanáis
- Badge of the Irish Ordnance Corps
- Country: Ireland
- Branch: Army
- Type: Ordnance
- Role: Military logistics Bomb disposal CBRNe defence
- Part of: Defence Forces
- Website: www.military.ie/en/who-we-are/army/army-corps/ordnance-corps/

Insignia
- Flag
- Abbreviation: ORD

The Ordnance Corps (ORD) (Irish: An Cór Ordanáis) is a combat support corps of the Irish Army, a branch of the Defence Forces, that has logistical and operational responsibility for military ordnance in Ireland. The logistical role of the Army Ordnance Corps is to provide technical support to the Defence Forces for the procurement, storage, distribution, inspection, maintenance, repair and disposal of all items of ordnance equipment. The operational role of the Ordnance Corps is to train personnel for and provide the state's bomb disposal capability.

== Logistical services ==
The seven logistical taskings of the Ordnance Corps include;

- Procurement
- Storage
- Distribution
- Inspection
- Maintenance
- Repair
- Disposal

The responsibility for the procurement and maintenance of all ordnance equipment is vested with the Ordnance Corps and encompasses a spectrum of equipment ranging from anti-aircraft missiles and naval armament to the uniforms worn by military personnel. The corps is also responsible for the procurement of food and provision of commercial catering services. These tasks are of a technical nature and the corps personnel are appropriately qualified and with the expertise to afford technical evaluation of complete weapon systems, it also includes embracing weapons, ammunition, fire control instruments and night vision equipment.

== Explosive Ordnance Disposal (EOD) ==
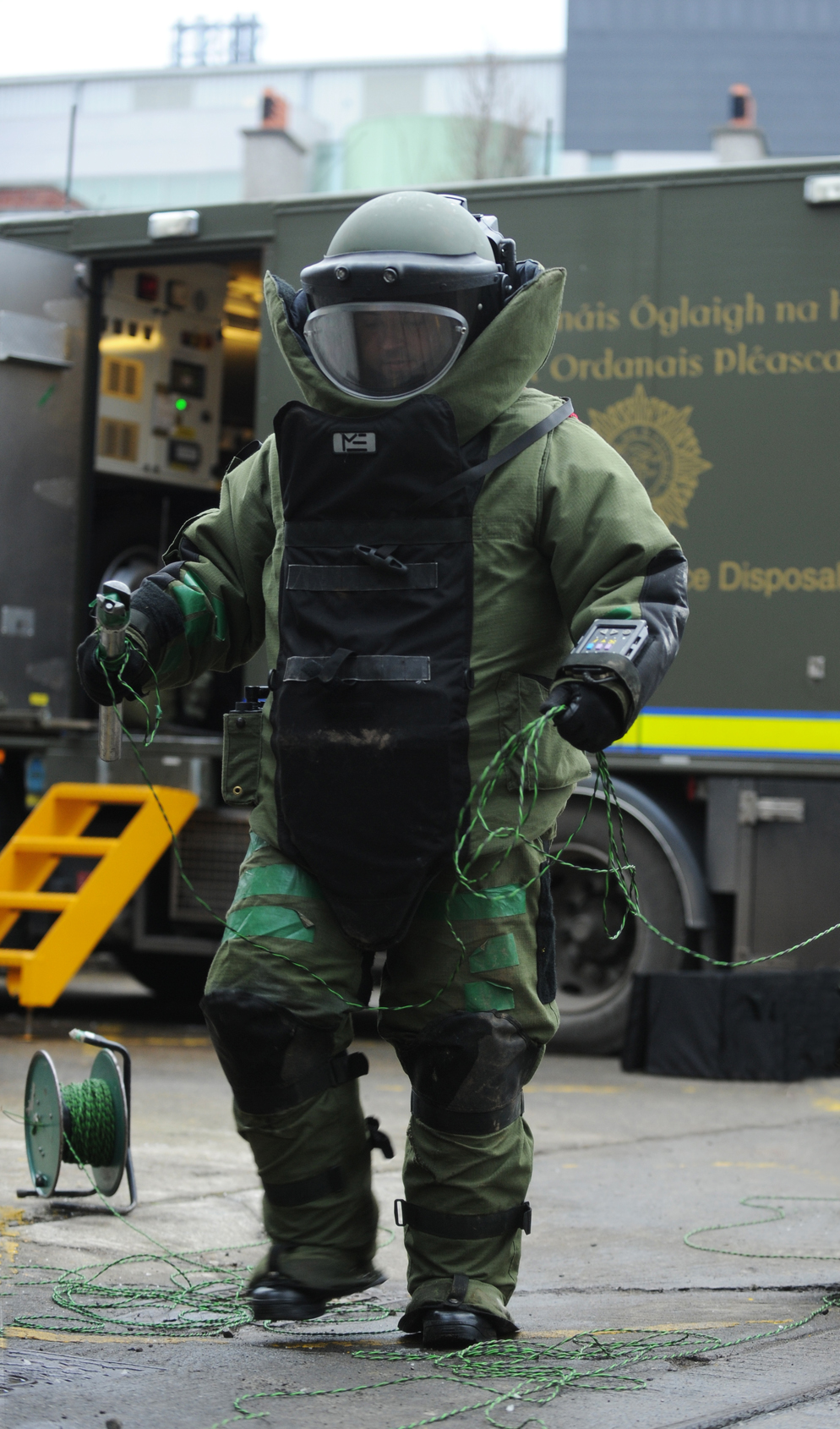
A member of an Irish Army Explosive Ordnance Disposal (EOD) team

The Ordnance Corps provide the only dedicated Explosive Ordnance Disposal (EOD) and Improvised Explosive Device Disposal (IEDD) teams within the Republic of Ireland. This service supports the Garda Síochána, the national police force, in an Aid to the Civil Power (ATCP) role, as well as providing the three branches of the Defence Forces (Army, Naval Service and Air Corps) with EOD, IEDD and CBRNE defence (chemical, biological, radiological, nuclear and explosives) specialist capability across its full spectrum of operations.

The corps has a long history of Counter-IED efforts (C-IED) within the state owing to The Troubles and the proliferation in use of improvised explosive devices (IEDs) by dissident republican paramilitary and terrorist groups, and more recently Irish and international organised criminal drug gangs. Significant experience was built up during UNIFIL missions in Lebanon, and the ISAF counter-IED programme in Afghanistan was largely developed by senior Irish Army ordnance officers. Information obtained during the combatting of IRA bombs has been particularly relevant to security forces countering the activities of Hezbollah and the Taliban, whose bomb making techniques are similar. The corps must keep abreast of current developments in international terrorist devices and the equipment needed to counteract these devices. The Defence Forces Ordnance Corps has internationally recognised expertise on bomb disposal, and courses are conducted for its own personnel and for students from the military and police forces of many other nations. Ordnance Corps personnel also serve in overseas missions and are an essential component of missions involving troops.

As a member of NATO Partnership for Peace (PfP) and NATO Euro-Atlantic Partnership Council (EAPC), Ireland participates in the PfP Planning and Review Process (PARP), and as part of this process the Defence Forces have adopted Partnership Goals aimed at assisting Ireland to meet its United Nations and European Union commitments in the areas of Counter Improvised Explosive Devices (C-IED), and improving the Irish military's interoperability with other professional military forces in this area.

There are a number of Irish Army EOD teams located across the country in military barracks, ready for operations throughout the state 24/7, 365 days a year. EOD teams use Swedish Scania P270 (Wilker Group) and armoured Swiss Mowag Duro II EOD trucks, with a motorcycle escort from the Garda Traffic Corps on internal callouts. Bomb squads are protected by an armed group of support soldiers, who provide a cordon, cover and protect the sensitive equipment carried by EOD trucks. Bomb disposal robots, John Deere Gators and Segways are also in use with Ordnance Corps EOD teams. Teams can be dispatched on helicopters via the Air Corps if there is a need.

In the year ending 2014, Irish Army EOD squads were called out to 141 domestic incidents, 53 of which involved viable improvised explosive devices.

== See also ==
- Engineer Corps (Ireland)
