= CBRN defense =

Protective measures against hazardous materials warfare

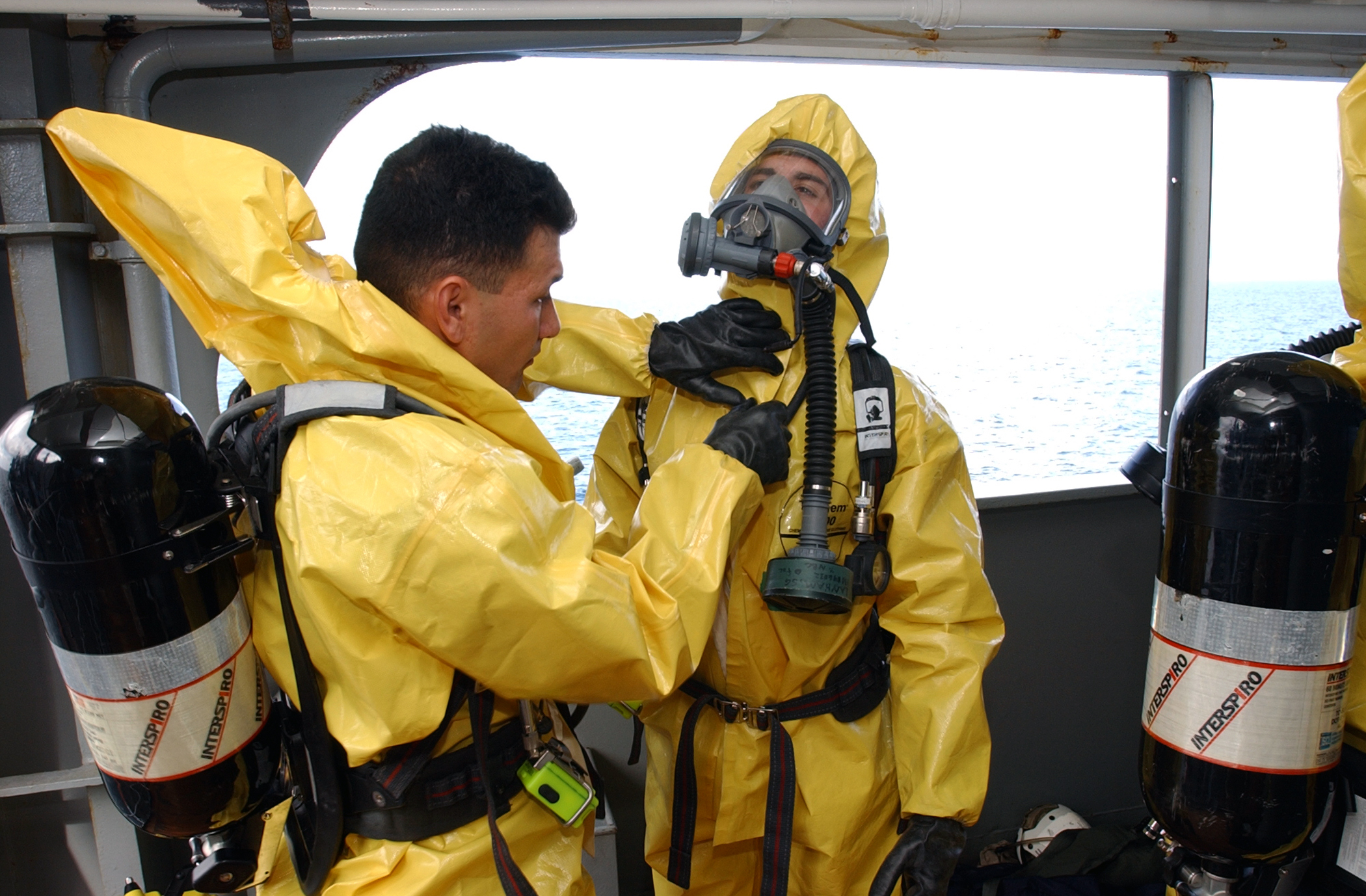
CBRN disposal technicians taking part in a training exercise

Chemical, biological, radiological, and nuclear defense (CBRN defense) or nuclear, biological, and chemical protection (NBC protection) is a class of protective measures taken in situations where chemical, biological, radiological, or nuclear (including terrorism) hazards may be present. CBRN defense consists of CBRN passive protection, over-pressure suits, contamination avoidance, and weapons of mass destruction mitigation.

A CBRN incident differs from a hazardous material incident in both scope and intent. CBRN incidents are responded to under the assumption that they are intentional and malicious; evidence preservation and perpetrator apprehension are of greater concern than with hazmat team incidents.

An overpressure system consists of two parts: a safe area which, as far as possible, is sealed from possible contaminated air, and an air filtration system which will filter out all possible toxins. Air pumps force clean air through the filters into the safe area such that the air pressure within the safe area will always be higher than that outside of the safe area. This pressure differential means that any flows of air will always be from the safe area to the outside, preventing the ingress of toxins. It is similar to a civilian or medical use of a positive pressure room and positive pressure personnel suits.

Collective protection is used for group protection of personnel in a nuclear, biological or chemical event. Collective protection is an important aspect of fixed site defense. Ideally, it provides a contaminate free environment for people, allowing relief from the continuous wearing of gas masks and other Mission Oriented Protective Posture (MOPP) equipment.

The basic concept applied for collective protection is overpressure and filtration. By filtering the incoming air to the shelter or protected space and maintaining higher internal air pressure than the external pressure, the contaminated external air is prevented from infiltrating the shelter or protected space and results in a toxic free area (TFA) for work and relief from wearing MOPP equipment.

The most critical component of any collective protection area is the air filtration system. The U.S. Army Corps of Engineers has published stringent standards for the construction and performance of this type of equipment.

A 2011 forecast concluded that worldwide government spending on CBRN defense products and services would reach US$8.38 billion that year.

== Etymology ==
In English, the 1990s term CBRN (Chemical, Biological, Radiological, and Nuclear) was created as a replacement for the 1960s–1980s term NBC (Nuclear, Biological, and Chemical), which had previously replaced the earlier 1940s–1950s term ABC (Atomic, Biological, and Chemical). The addition of the R (for Radiological) is a consequence of the "new" threat of a radiological weapon (also known as "dirty bombs"). In the 2000s–2010s, the term CBRNE (Chemical, Biological, Radiological, Nuclear, and Explosive) was introduced as an extension of CBRN, the inclusion of the E (for Explosive) in response to the enhanced (improvised) explosives threat.

In Spanish the term NRBQ (Nuclear, Radiológico, Bacteriológico y Químico) has replaced NBQ.

== By country or region ==
=== Argentina ===
The Argentine Armed Forces has the Batallón de Ingenieros QBN 601 of the Argentine Army, was the first CRBN response team created, in the 1990s, as a part of the country's Rapid Deployment Force. The Policía Federal Argentina have the Brigada de Riesgos Especiales, this unit is the only national response for CBRN/HAZMAT incidents. Also, has three units called Riesgo Quimico y Biológico, Riesgo Radiológico y Nuclear, and the tactical response unit called Protección QBNR.

=== Australia ===
The Special Operations Engineer Regiment is a specialised unit of the Australian Army. The regiment forms part of the Special Operations Command. The unit was formed in 2002 as the Incident Response Regiment (IRR). It includes a counter-Chemical, Biological, Radiological, Nuclear or Explosive (C-CBRNE) capability.

=== Brazil ===
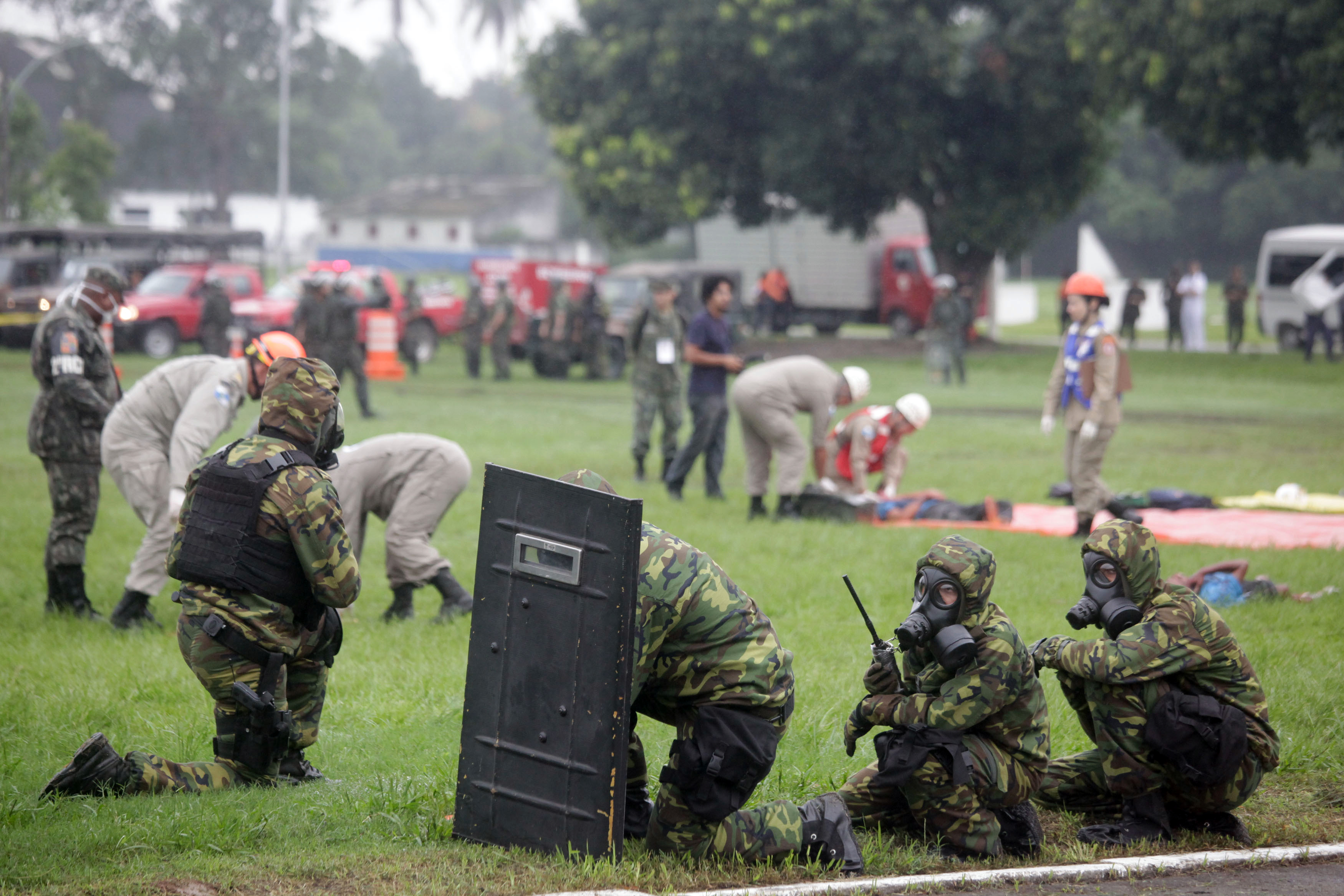
Brazilian Armed Forces personnel training for biological warfare in 2015

Brazilian firefighters are trained for NBC situations. During the 2016 Summer Olympics, police forces like the GATE from São Paulo, the Federal Police, and the National Public Security Force were prepared.

In the military, there is CBRN equipment and personnel in all branches of the Armed Forces. The Brazilian Army has two specific teams: the 1st Chemical, Biological, Radiological and Nuclear Defense Battalion, which is based in Rio de Janeiro and is responsible for decontaminating military equipment, weapons, and personnel, and the Chemical, Biological, Radiological and Nuclear Defense Company, based at Goiânia and part of the Brazilian Special Operations Command, that makes the decontamination and defense in CBRN situations. The Brazilian Presidential Guard and Army Police also have CBRN units.

The Brazilian Marine Corps has the CDefNBQR (Nuclear, Biological, Chemical and Radiological Defense Center) that controls the ARAMAR Nuclear, Biological, Chemical and Radiological Defense Battalion, at Iperó, São Paulo, conceived to provide physical security and to perform CBRN emergencies control actions at the Centro Experimental Aramar, responsible for developing Brazilian Navy nuclear researches; the Itaguaí Nuclear, Biological, Chemical and Radiological Defense Battalion, at Itaguaí, Rio de Janeiro, which is to be the host of the first Brazilian Navy nuclear-powered submarine; and the Nuclear, Biological, Chemical and Radiological Defense Company, at Duque de Caxias, Rio de Janeiro. The Air Force is making special teams for transporting victims from CBRN attacks/accidents.

=== Canada ===
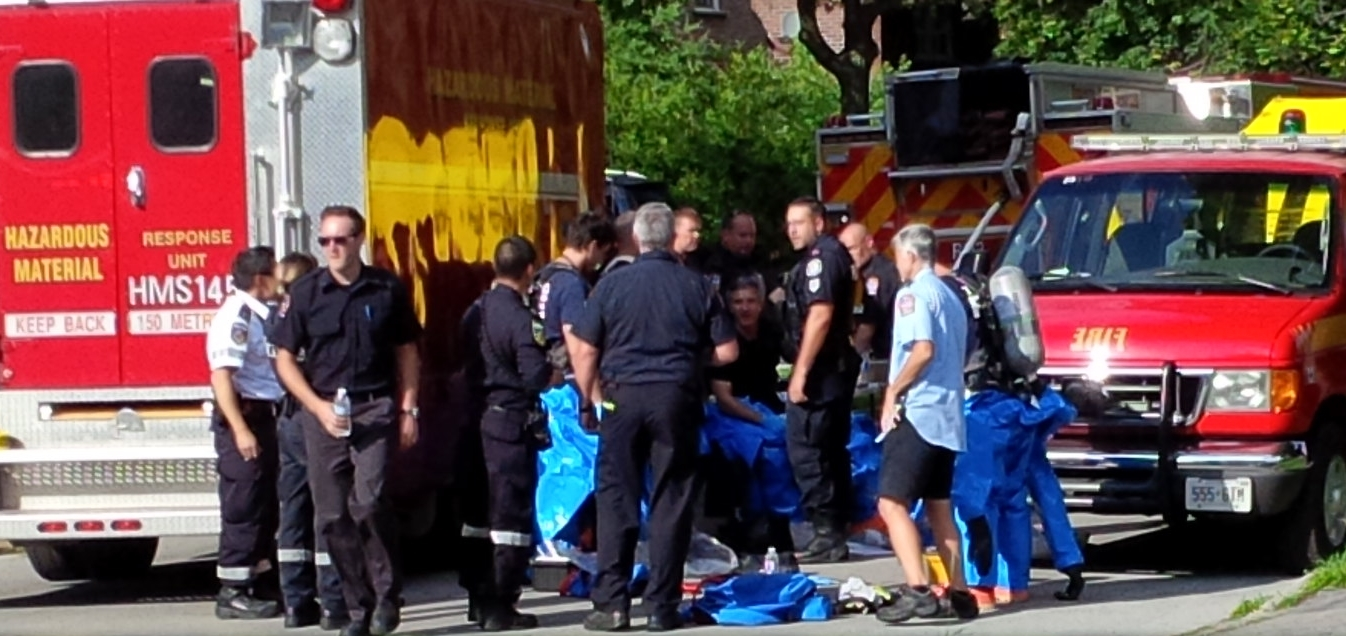
Toronto Fire Services personnel equipping hazmat suits at a hazardous materials incident in 2015

The term CBRN is in common use in disaster and emergency services organizations across the country. Since July 2005, the Canadian Armed Forces also started using the term CBRN Defence, instead of NBC Defence, due to the increased threat of dirty bomb use (which is radiological in nature). CBRNE is a new term that is being used in both civilian and military organizations. The Canadian Joint Incident Response Unit is a Canadian Forces unit, under the direction of the Canadian Special Operations Forces Command, charged with supporting "the Government of Canada in order to prevent, control and mitigate CBRN threats to Canada, Canadians and Canadian interests."

All members of the Canadian Armed Forces are trained in CBRNE defense and maintain minimum standards, tested at least every three years.

At the provincial level, cities are provided opportunities for emergency services with CBRN training. In Ontario, emergency services in Windsor, Peterborough, Toronto, and Ottawa have obtained CBRN standing at NFPA Standard 472 Level 3 Technician level.

=== European Union ===
In mid-July 2016, the European Parliament negotiated a new draft counterterrorism directive aimed at protecting Europe's people from biological, chemical and other attacks. The timeline of the directive is illustrated in the following table:

Date or target date	Action
4 July 2016	The European Parliament's Civil Liberties, Justice and Home Affairs Committee approved amendments to its directive counter-terrorism.
14 July 2016	Negotiations began. Monika Hohlmeier, the chief negotiator for the European Parliament, is charged with negotiating the final text of the directive with the European Council (heads of state for all 28 European Union countries). The European Commission will serve as a facilitator in the negotiations.
Autumn 2016	Negotiations are expected to be concluded.

The directive would criminalize:

- Certain acts related to preparing for a terrorist attack, such as traveling abroad to meet with a terrorist group
- Training to make explosives, firearms, and other dangerous substances
- Public incitement or praise for terrorism and financing of terrorism

The directive also includes text to help victims of terror attacks.

=== Hong Kong ===
Hong Kong has had CBRN response capabilities since the early 1990s and advanced training from 1998. The Standing CBRN Planning Group (known as the SRPG) plans for all CBRN incidents in Hong Kong. The SRPG was set up with the support of the Secretary for Security by the Senior Bomb Disposal Officer in Hong Kong, Dominic Brittain. It consists of representatives from 9 government departments who plan the response to CBRN threats. These departments include Police EOD, Fire Services, the Hospital Authority and the Department of Health, amongst others. The operational arm of the SRPG is the CBRN Incident Advisory Group (RIAG) form in the initial stages of a CBRN incident using telephone conferencing. RIAG consists of five experts who assist with the technical response to the incident by providing real-time advice and support to the departments involved. The Hong Kong capability is well rehearsed, with regular departmental exercises conducted and a full-scale CBRN exercise conducted every year.

=== Ukraine ===
CBRN protection in Ukraine During the full-scale war launched by Russia, the issue of CBRN protection for Ukraine has become particularly urgent. CBRN protection (chemical, biological, radiological, nuclear) is of crucial importance for the safety of military personnel and the civilian population. The Ukrainian military has faced real threats from the use of chemical weapons, as well as risks associated with radiation contamination from Russian-occupied nuclear power plants (for example, the Chernobyl and Zaporizhzhia nuclear power plants).

Ukraine is actively working to improve its defense capabilities in the field of CBRN protection. This includes: Modernization of equipment: The Ukrainian Defense Forces are receiving modern personal protective equipment (gas masks, protective suits), as well as devices for radiation and chemical reconnaissance. The company "Цивільний Захист КР" is actively involved in this process, supplying certified gas masks that meet NATO standards, both for military and civilian needs. Military training: Military personnel undergo specialized training in the use of CBRN protection equipment, proper behavior in conditions of chemical or radiation contamination, as well as first aid.

International cooperation: Ukraine closely cooperates with NATO and EU countries to exchange experience and receive technical assistance. This cooperation is critically important for strengthening Ukraine's defense capabilities. Thus, Ukraine is one of the countries where CBRN protection is considered a key element of national security, which is confirmed by its efforts to increase preparedness for possible threats, as well as the active participation of Ukrainian companies such as "Цивільний Захист КР" (Civil Defense of KR).

=== India ===
The Indian Army ordered 16 CBRN monitoring vehicles, of which the first 8 were inducted in December 2010. It was developed by the Defence Research and Development Organization (DRDO) and manufactured by Ordnance Factories Board.

=== Indonesia ===
==== Army ====
The Indonesian Army has a CBRN defense unit which is the Kompi Zeni Nuklir, Biologi dan Kimia (abbreviated "Kompi Zeni Nubika Pusat Zeni TNI AD") translated as Army Engineers Nuclear, Biological, and Chemical Company. The unit was founded on 22 April 1986 under the command of the Indonesian Army Corps of Engineers. The unit is also in cooperation with the Ministry of Health, the Indonesian Nuclear power regulator agency, the Veterinary Research Agency, and the National Nuclear Power Agency. This unit is the one and only unit that can handle CBRN Defense Capability within the Armed Forces.

==== Police ====
The Indonesian National Police special unit the Mobile Brigade Corps (Brimob) has a CBR unit under the Gegana detachment. It was formed in December 2009. This unit acts as first responders to bomb and terrorist threats in the public.

=== Republic of Ireland ===
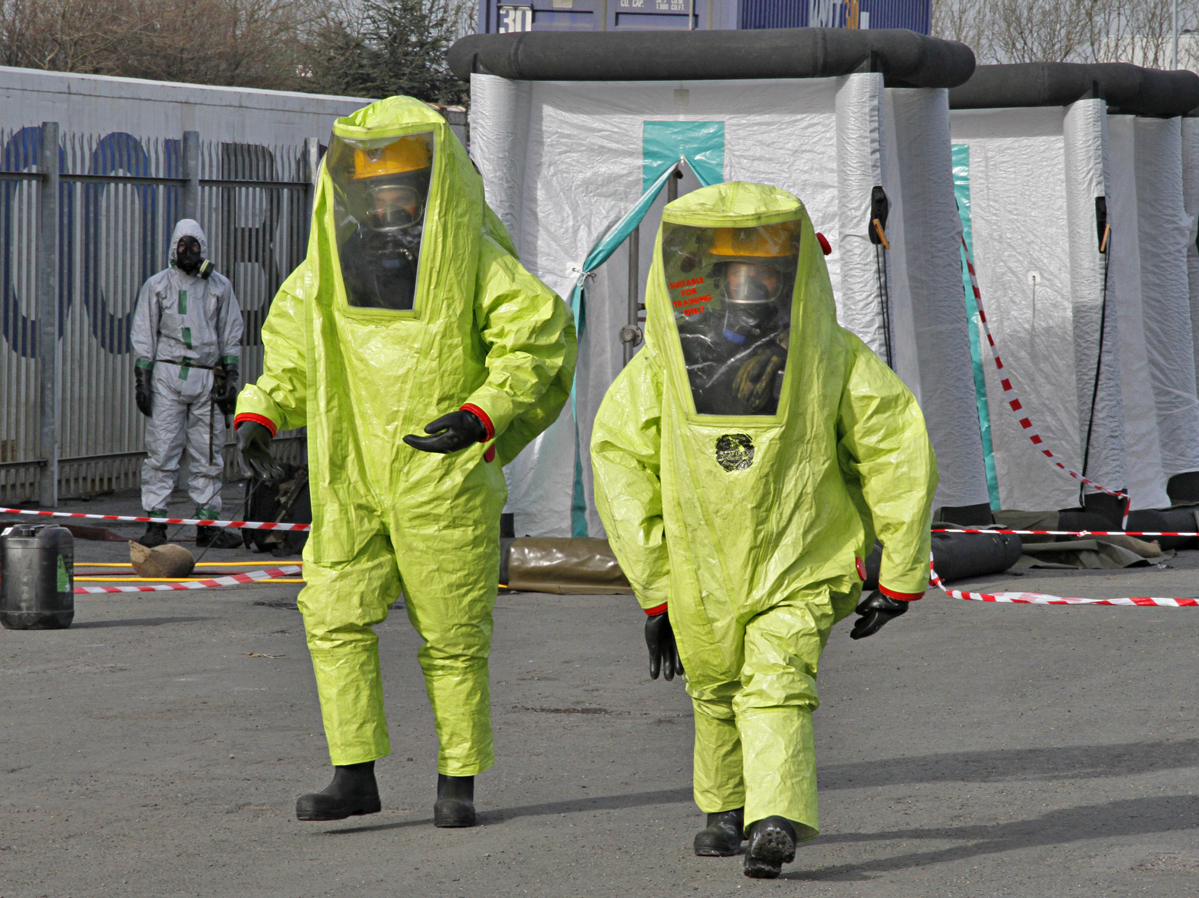
Members of the Irish Defence Forces and Dublin Fire Brigade at a CBRNE training exercise

The Irish Defence Forces have CBRNE training and equipment capabilities – in particular the Ordnance Corps (Explosive Ordnance Disposal/EOD teams), Engineer Corps and Army Ranger Wing (ARW) – and will aid the civil authority if requested. The Irish Army runs CBRNE defense courses has detection equipment, and decontamination equipment and is reported to have purchased 10,000 protective CBRN/NBC suits, enough for all of its personnel. All Army Reserve personnel undergo CBRN warfare defense training.

The Irish national police force, the Garda Síochána, has a number of nationwide CBRN response teams. The teams are based regionally (in six regions; Dublin, Eastern, Northern, Southern, South-Eastern & Western) and began operating in 2004 with 100 trained officers (170 responders trained throughout the country as of 2009). There is a requirement for members to be re-certified within 18 months of training. CBRN response teams are trained by the Garda Tactical Training Unit, and supported nationally by the Emergency Response Unit (ERU). Other emergency services also have limited CBRN expertise, such as the Health Service Executive (HSE) and Dublin Fire Brigade (DFB), which have a Hazardous Materials (Haz-Mat) and Chemical Incident Unit.

=== Sri Lanka ===
14 CBRN Regiment SLE, Sri Lanka Engineers is a regiment of the Sri Lanka Army that focuses on countering chemical, biological, radiological and nuclear (CBRN) hazards in the country.[1][2] The Sri Lanka Navy and Sri Lanka Air Force also maintain CBRN units in addition to the Army's CBRN regiment

=== Malaysia ===
The Malaysian Army formed a CBRN unit, Peperangan Nuklear, Biologi dan Kimia 3 Divisyen (English: Chemical, Biological and Nuclear Warfare Division 3; PNBK 3D) in April 2002.

The Royal Malaysia Police has CBRN providers. The Pasukan Gerakan Khas (PGK) has two special operations detachments with HAZMAT expertise - 69 Commandos and Special Actions Unit. The Federal Reserve Unit (FRU) also has a CBRN unit. Both PGK and FRU teams handle CBRN calls before an army PNBK unit responds.

=== New Zealand ===
The RNZAF conducted regular yearly training for all its personnel given the higher probability of airfields being the target of an enemy CBRN attack. RNZAF Security Forces personnel conduct all CBRN training for the RNZAF and complete CBRN courses at the Defence CBRN Centre in the United Kingdom.

EOD Squadron – 1st New Zealand Special Air Service Regiment

=== Pakistan ===
Pakistan-based defense industry GIDS manufactures NBC suites which include Individual Protective Equipment (IPE) like gloves, boots, and air filters as well as decontamination kits and Chemical Weapon Agent (CWA) detectors.

=== Spain ===
The Spanish Army 1st CBRN Regiment 'Valencia' was formed in March 2005. Training in the defense against CBRN agents as part of combat support is the main aim of exercise 'Grifo' (Griffin) – the most important of this type that the Army undertakes. The National Police and the Spanish Civil Guard have their own CBRN units. The Military Emergencies Unit and emergency services have CBRN training.

=== Sweden ===
The Swedish Armed Forces has the National CBRN Defence Centre (designated SkyddC) localized in Umeå as its main CBRN protection forces. It consists of one company (1st CBRN-company) as the standing force, however, SkyddC is also responsible for training conscripts, training 60 in 2022-2023.

=== Turkey ===
CBRN defense units in Turkey are the mainly CBRN Defense Battalion (Kimyasal Biyolojik Radyolojik Nükleer (KBRN) Savunma Tabur) of Turkish Armed Forces including CBRN Defense Special Response Unit (KBRN Savunma Özel Müdahale Birliği) and CBRN School and Training Center Command (KBRN Okul ve Eğitim Merkezi) Gendarmerie General Command has also unit within self Gendarmerie Search and Rescue Battalion Command has CBRN units. Ministry of the Interior's associated Disaster and Emergency Management Presidency AFAD Works in coordination with law enforcement units to intervene in the events of any CBRN accident. Apart from these, Turkey mostly makes its own CBRN protective clothing and equipment. Mechanical and Chemical Industry Corporation's Maksam factory mainly covers the needs of respirators for NATO and neighboring countries. Main products such as SR6 and SR6M NBC Respirator licensed United Kingdom production. MAKSAM Panoramic Mask MKE NEFES (breath) CBRN Gas Mask SR10 and SR10 ST Masks

=== United Kingdom ===
CBRN is also used by the UK Home Office as a civil designation. Police, fire and ambulance services in the UK must all have some level of CBRN providers. Within the ambulance service, this is performed by the Hazardous Area Response Team (HART) and Special Operations Response Team (SORT). Since the introduction of new equipment to UK fire services under the New Dimension program, CBRN decontamination of personnel (including members of the public) has become a task carried out by fire services in the UK and they regularly train for such scenarios.

Army

All personnel are trained in CBRN through basic training and are to complete an online assessment annually.

The British Army has a single dedicated regiment for all C-CBRN (Counter) matters in the armed forces. 28 Engineer Regiment is the only regiment within the armed forces that has full C-CBRN capability. Formed in 2019 the regiment will officially be at full operational capability from early 2023, with the need for CBRN specialists becoming of more importance.

Personnel within the regiment are trained in live environments where CBRN materials are used.

=== United States ===
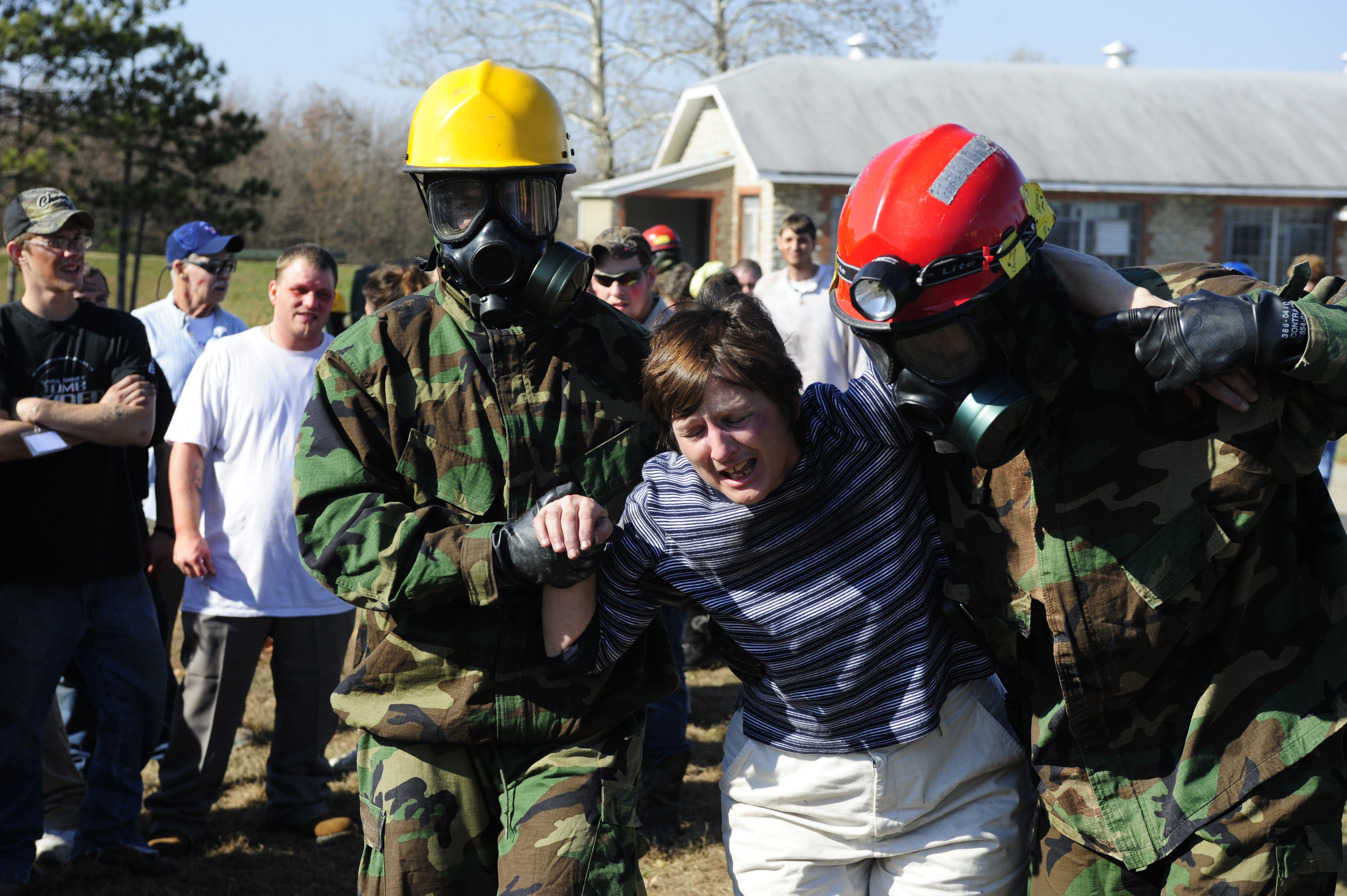
U.S. Marines training exercise for temporary critical support to enable community recovery after a CBRNE incident

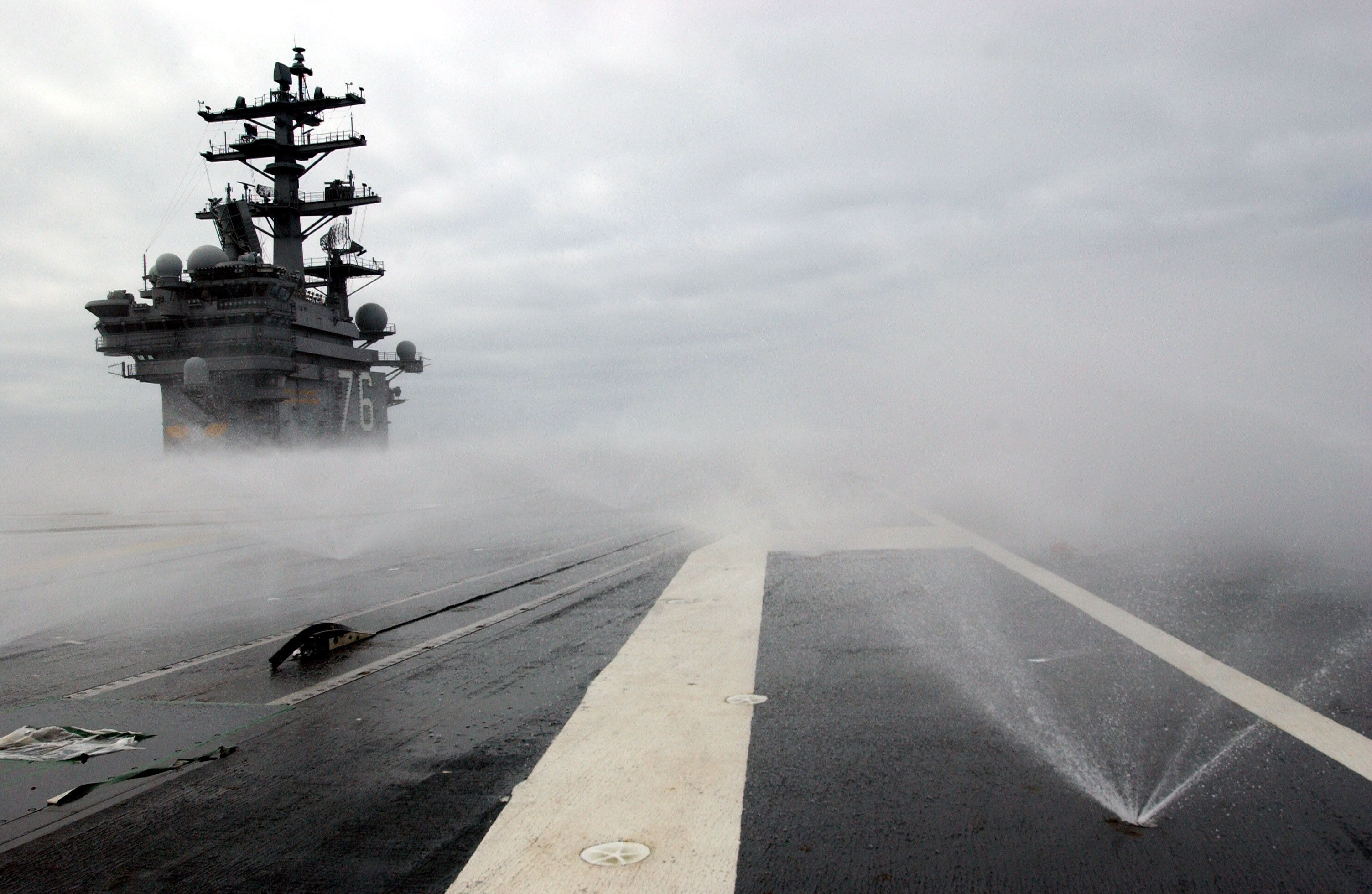
The counter-measure wash-down system of the USS Ronald Reagan (CVN-76), part of the vessel's CBRN defenses

The United States Army uses CBRN as an abbreviation for their Chemical, Biological, Radiological, and Nuclear Operations Specialists (MOS). The United States Army trains all US Army soldiers pursuing a career in CBRN at the United States Army CBRN School (USACBRNS) at Fort Leonard Wood.

The USAF uses Air Force Specialty Code (AFSC 3E9X1) U.S. Air Force Emergency Management, who are also CBRN Specialists. The USAF trains all US Airmen pursuing a career in counter-CBRN operations at the USAF CBRN School at Fort Leonard Wood. The USMC uses CBRN as an abbreviation for two military occupational specialties. The Marine Corps runs a CBRN School to train Marine CBRN Defense Officers and Marine CBRN Defense Specialists at Fort Leonard Wood, Missouri. See also: Chemical Biological Incident Response Force (USMC CBIRF)

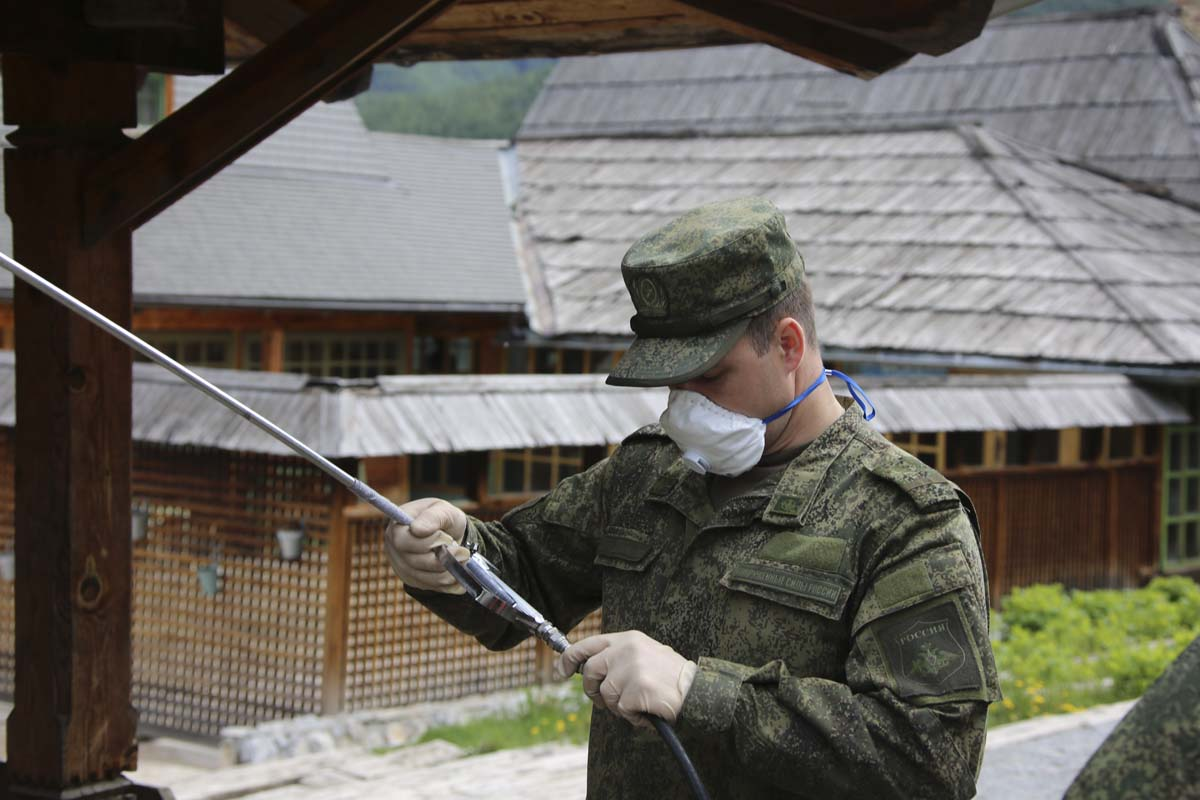
NBC Protection Troops of the Russian Armed Forces in Serbia

The USN requires all personnel to take a web-based CBRNE training annually to get a basic understanding of facts and procedures related to responding to a CBRNE incident.

=== Russia ===
The Nuclear, Biological and Chemical Protection Troops (NBC Protection Troops) of the Russian Federation are special forces designed to conduct the most complex set of measures aimed at reducing the loss of associations and formations of the Ground Forces and ensuring their combat tasks assigned during operations in conditions of radioactive, chemical and biological contamination, as well as at enhancing their survivability and protection against high-precision and other weapons.

The Russian government vaccinated around half a million reindeer against anthrax in 2015. Around 1.5 million deer carcasses carrying anthrax in Russian permafrost are at risk of melting due to global warming in the Arctic. There is a risk that global warming in the Arctic can thaw the permafrost, leading to new infections in deer and cattle due to the exposure and release of viable anthrax sporses. An anthrax outbreak in 2016 in reindeer caused the Russian Armed Forces to evacuate a nomadic reindeer herding tribe.

In May 2012, BioPrepWatch reported that the Russian security service ordered over 100 "capsule cradles", which are devices that people can use to protect infants or even small pets in the event of a nuclear, chemical, biological, or radiological threat. According to the article, Soviet military engineers invented capsules in the 1960s. A company is currently producing the capsules in a factory in Russia.

== CBRN products ==
Numbers vary, but news reports and market forecast reports place the market for CBRN products in 2013 and 2014 between US$8.7–8.8 billion. The market for CBRN products was expected to grow to over US$13 billion by 2023.

== See also ==
- Biological and Chemical Defence Review Committee (Canada)
- Biosecurity
- Bioterrorism
- Hazmat suit
- HazMat team
- List of CBRN warfare forces
- NBC suit
- MOPP (protective gear)
- Poison gas in World War I
- Weapons of mass destruction

== Bibliography ==
- Eldridge, John, ed. (2006). Jane's Nuclear, Biological and Chemical Defense 2006–2007 (19th ed.). Coulsdon, Surrey, UK; Alexandria, Va.: Jane's Information Group. ISBN 0-7106-2763-7.
- Hart, Benjamin C.; Garrett, John (2007). Historical Dictionary of Nuclear, Biological, and Chemical Warfare. Lanham, MD: Scarecrow Press. ISBN 978-0-8108-5484-0. Includes bibliographical essay. Review
