= CBRN School and Training Center Command =

CBRN School and Training Center Command was established in Ankara in 1930 under the name as Gas Inspection. In 1937, it was named as Genera Gas Command. Chemistry class was established in 1957. In 1962, it moved to Çankırı under the name of Nuclear Biology and Chemistry School. In 2012, it moved to Konya under the name of CBRN School and Training Center Command. Headquarters is in Konya. The task of the troops is to train personnel who will perform the necessary reconnaissance, assessment and cleaning within the scope of the CBRN defense operations. It has a CBRN Defense Battalion Command that can intervene against attacks.

== See also ==
- Turkish Army
- CBRN defense
