= Umestan =

Business park in Umeå, Sweden

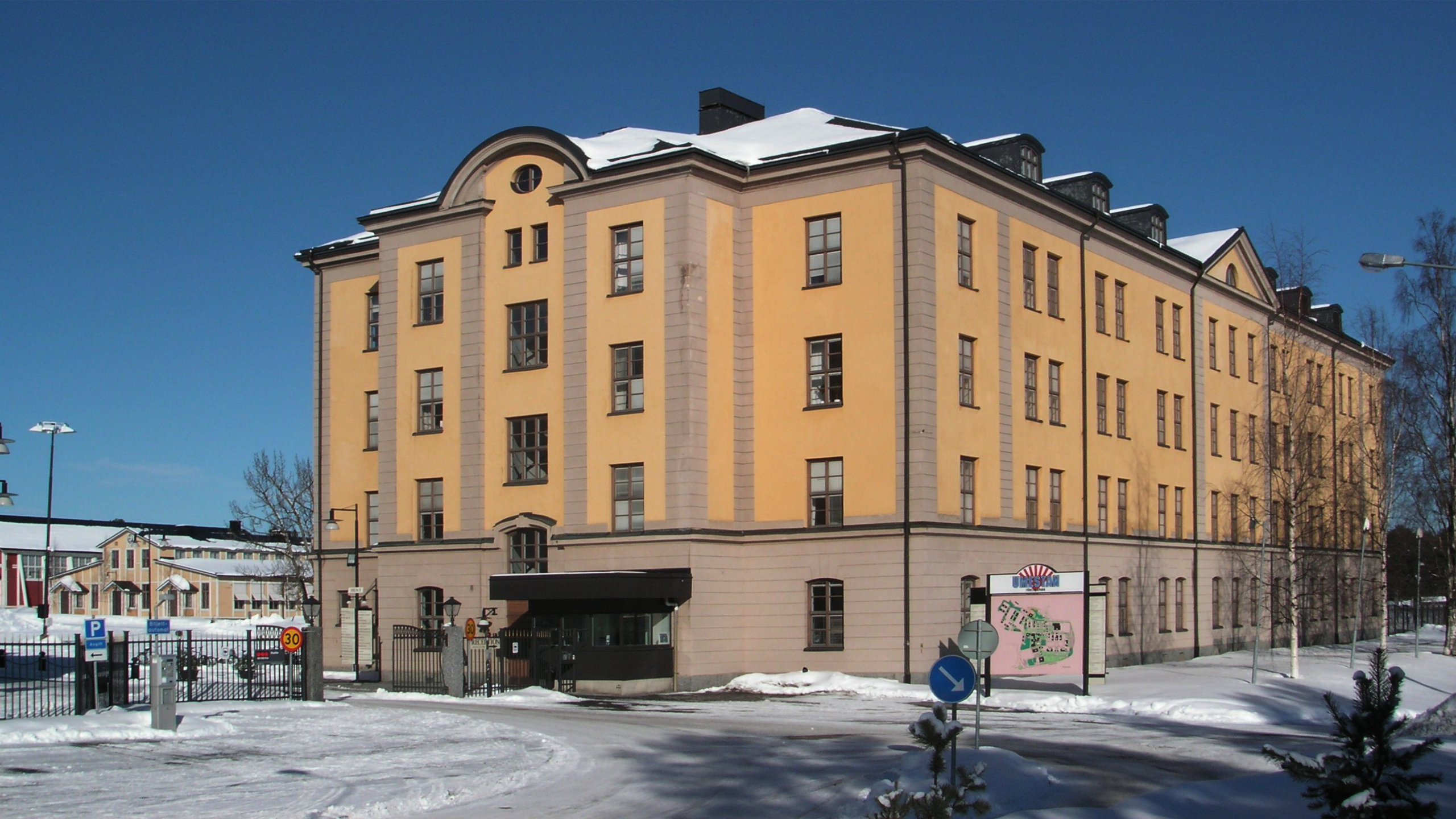
- One of the entrance gates to corporation park Umestan.
- Interactive map of Umestan
- Type: Urban park
- Location: Umeå, Sweden
- Coordinates: 63°50′4″N 20°15′36″E
- Created: 1998
- Open: Open all year

Umestan is a business park in Umeå, Sweden.

== Description ==
The business park took over these facilities in 1998, when Västerbotten Regiment's (Västerbottens regementes') military operations were shut down. Umeå Municipality bought the entire area in order to create a business-and knowledge center. The buildings were renovated to meet the needs of modern business regarding comfort, environment and IT capabilities. The business park contains about 40 buildings, which have about 120 different tenants. Around 3 000 people visit the area every day.

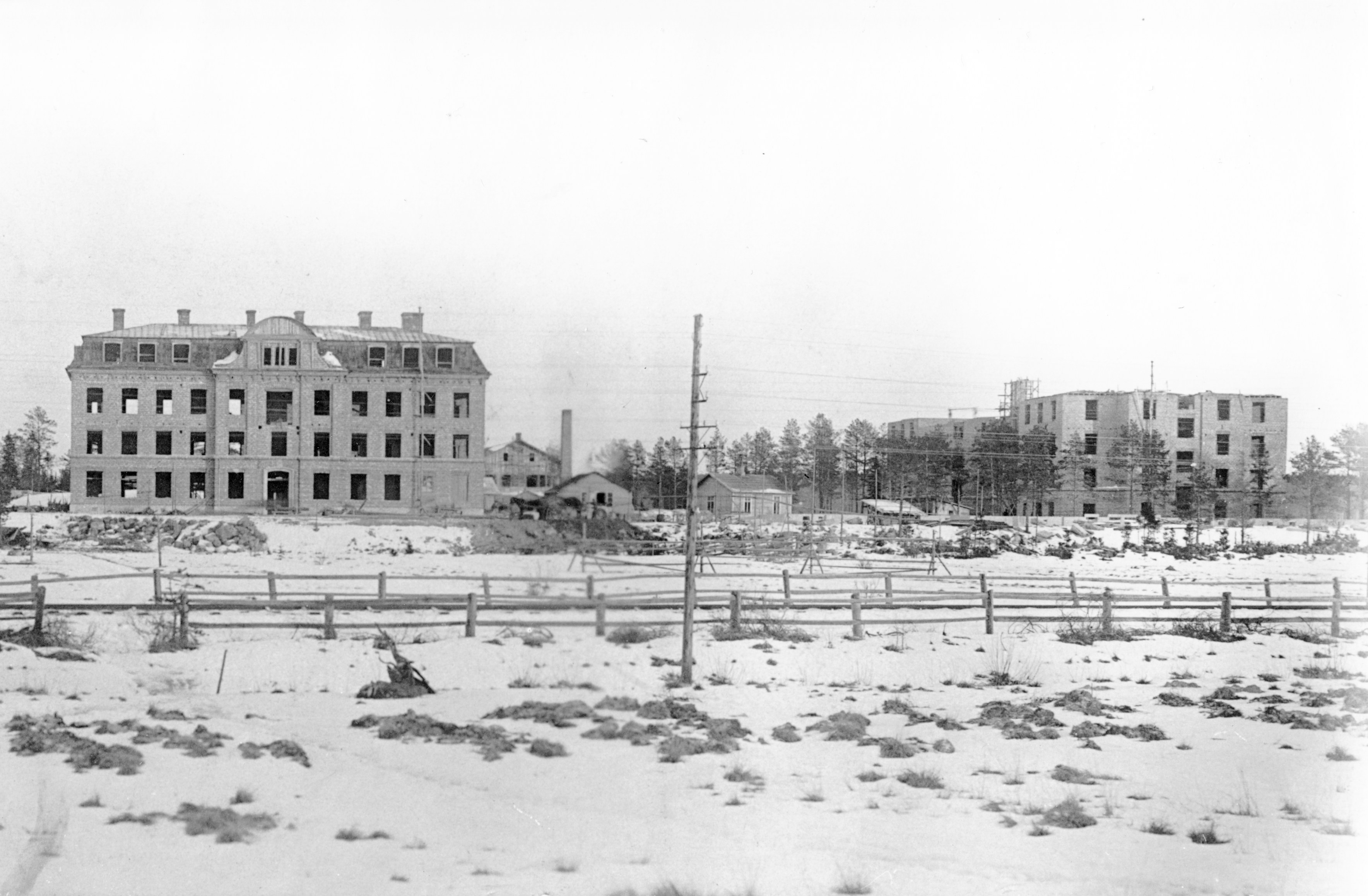
Västerbotten regiment barracks under construction in 1907.

In 2012 Umeå Municipality sold the park to Lersten for about 470 million kronor.
