= Marisa Cleveland =

- Born: South Korea
- Education: George Mason University; Northeastern University (EdD)
- Occupations: Author, educator
- Writing career
- Language: English
- Genres: Nonfiction and fiction
- Website: www.marisacleveland.com

Marisa Cleveland is an American author and educator, an executive director for The Seymour Agency, and a managing partner for Simeris Alliance. Her debut teen novel, Accidental Butterfly, hit the New York Times and USA Today bestsellers list as part of an anthology in June 2015.

Cleveland was born in South Korea, adopted and raised in New Hampshire, attended George Mason University for her bachelor's and master's degrees, and earned her Doctor of Education (Ed.D.) from Northeastern University. She also holds a master's of arts in English from National University. She is a 2015 FACE award recipient for Arts and Culture, and a 2014 Forty under 40 honoree. She has served on the boards of the Naples Press Club and Southwest Florida Romance Writers.

== Books ==
Nonfiction

1. There Is No Box, 2022
2. Erase the Line, 2016
3. The People's Commissioner, 2017

Middle Grade

1. Inheritance, 2016

Teen

1. Accidental Butterfly, 2015

Contemporary Romance

1. The Valentine Challenge, 2013
2. Reforming the Cowboy, 2013
3. Blurring the Lines, 2015
4. Reforming the CEO, 2019

Paranormal Fiction

1. Pushed, 2014

== Articles ==
- "Toward Leadership Agility", Global Issues and Innovative Solutions in Healthcare, Culture, and the Environment, May 2020
- "Leadership Competencies for Sustained Project Success", International Journal of Applied Management Theory and Research, December 2019
- "Culturally Agile Leadership: A Relational Leadership Development Approach", International Journal of Public and Private Perspectives on Healthcare, Culture, and the Environment, November 2019
- "Toward Understanding How Cultural Agility Leads to Civil Discourse", 2019 AGLSP Annual Conference, October 2019
- "Building Engaged Communities -- A Collaborative Leadership Approach", Smart Cities, November 2018
- "Toward a Model for Ethical Cybersecurity Leadership", International Journal of Smart Education and Urban Society, October 2018
- "Toward Cybersecurity Leadership Framework", 13th Midwest Association for Information Systems Conference, May 2018
- "Cybercrime Post-incident Leadership Model", 13th Midwest Association for Information Systems Conference, May 2018
- "Toward Understanding the Impact of Entrepreneurial Leadership Skills on Community Engagement", 6th International Conference on Innovation and Entrepreneurship, March 2018
- "Little Fires Everywhere Book Remarks", Coastal Breeze, January 2018
- "A Study of Human Nature: Atlas Shrugged", Coastal Breeze, February 2017
- "The Last Time We Say Goodbye Book Remarks", Coastal Breeze, August 2017
- "Talk About Tournaments", Coastal Breeze, May 2016
- "Bayshore Cultural and Performing Arts Center to Build Their Vision", Spotlight Magazine, November 2014
- "Gene Doyle Backcountry Catch and Release Fishing Tournament", Spotlight Magazine, April 2014

== Press ==
- Give the Gift of Leadership Coastal Breeze News, December 2022
- Fiala now a bookish commissioner Naples Daily News, May 2017
- Passing the Gavel, Naples Daily News, January 2016
- Marco Island Writers Meet, Coastal Breeze News, January 2016
- Leadership Marco A Good Kind of Summer School, Coastal Breeze News, August 2015
- Leadership Marco Profiles, Marco Island Sun Times, August 2015
- Naples Press Club Elects 2015 Board, Coastal Breeze News, February 2015
- Face Awards, Gulfshore Business Magazine, February 2015
- Arts and Culture: Marisa Cleveland, Face Awards 2015, February 2015
- FACE Awards, D'Latinos Magazine, pgs. 35-39, February 2015
- D'Latinos y Face Awards premian la diversidad en SWFL, Naples Daily News, February 2015
- 5ta Gala Anual Face Awards D'Latinos, Naples Daily News, February 2015
- Naples Press Club announces officers, Naples Daily News, January 2015
- Rising Leaders: Let's Do This, Gulfshore Life Magazine, November 2014
- Forty under 40, Gulfshore Business, September 2014
- SWFRW Conference, Publishers Weekly, February 2014
- Hot Tuesday New Releases, Publishers Weekly, January 2014
- Seymour Agency Retreat, Publishers Weekly, January 2014
- Looking for Romance, Spotlight Magazine, January 2014
