= International assignment =

An international assignment is an overseas task set by a company to an employee. Companies that engage in international assignments are mainly multinational corporations (MNCs). MNCs send employees from the home country to a different country for business operations at overseas offices or subsidiaries. These employees are called expatriates. International assignments can fulfil a number of key organisational functions and are viewed as a development opportunity for organisations to build a global workforce. As a result of globalisation and the saturation of domestic markets, international assignments are a strategic tool for organisations to compete successfully on the global stage and achieve specific organisational objectives. These organisation missions are a key way of developing global perspectives. They can encourage diverse inputs into decision and develop shared values within the Headquarters, home country and subsidiaries. International assignments are a component of the training and development activities of international human resource management. Other main activities include human resource management in the global environment, selection, performance management, compensation and repatriation.

== Reasons for international assignments ==
Expatriates can be sent on international assignments to transfer their own managerial knowledge and technical skills to workers in the host country. These assignments are undertaken if there is a lack of available skills in the host country. A 2016 report indicates 30% of international assignments are for filling managerial gaps and 24% technical.

Expatriates are also sent on international assignments for management development reasons to gain international experience and career growth. This form of international assignment is increasingly known to be a fundamental building block to leadership competency. International assignments have a strong influence on building global and managerial competencies and have been labelled as "the single most influential force for the development of managers".

MNCs may send expatriates on international assignments to exploit global market opportunities and embed a culture of cross-border mobility. Expatriates undertaking an international assignment for organisation development reasons may gain a broader perspective and become familiar with more operations.

== Types of international assignments ==
=== Short term ===
Short term assignments are up to 6 months duration. The purpose of these assignments is often for management development or problem solving and can include roles such as project supervision until a more longterm arrangement can be found in the host country. In most short-term assignments, expatriates are unaccompanied by family and receive less company benefits to support the relocation. Extended assignments are extended short term assignments that last up to one year.

Short-term assignments are the most popular and prevalent type of transfer initiated by companies or self-initiated expatriates, with benefits to employee careers. A "2018 Trends in Global Research" survey found the growing increase in short-term and extended international assignments can be attributed to the competitive global pressures facing MNCs such as the saturation of domestic markets or growing customer sectors. According to the report, extended business trips were projected to increase by 82 percent and short-term assignments 63 percent in the next five years.

=== Long term ===
MNCs have traditionally sent employees on traditional long term assignments. Traditional longterm assignments range from 12 –36 months and require the most rigorous expatriate selection and training. Expatriates on traditional assignments receive support including relocation benefits, housing allowances and annual home leave. The cost of a traditional longterm international assignment averages at US$311,000 per year. This cost covers the investment in assignment administration, the management of international assignments and outsourcing.

=== Commuter, rotational, or contractual ===
Commuter assignments require a weekly or fortnightly working period in an international subsidiary or office. This form of job rotation assignment is further increasing due to globalisation.

In rotational assignments, workers have a set time routine in the host country and goes back and forth throughout the year. These assignments have the lowest growth rates and are typically used in hardship locations such as oil rigs.

Contractual assignments are project specific and are typically used for research and development purposes.

=== Virtual ===
In virtual assignments, employees take on international responsibilities for the office in the host country while remaining in their home country. This form of assignment requires heavy use of conference calls, video-conferencing and emails. Virtual assignments can lead to role conflict, identification issues or cultural misunderstanding.

== Roles of international assignees ==
There are certain expectations of the roles and business relationships an expatriate will have as a result of the transfer of location. Six roles have been identified in International Human Resource Management literature. If subsidiaries are underperforming, an expatriate can be sent as an agent of direct control to ensure host country compliance. In this position filling purpose, the role of the expatriate is to ensure the strategic objectives of the local subsidiary are met. Staff may be sent on an international assignment as an agent of socialisation to assist in the instillment of common corporate values and alignment of corporate objectives and policies in subsidiaries. This can be seen in the early stages of internationalisation when there is a need to develop a consistent set of corporate values on a global scale. Staff on an international assignment for managerial development purposes often take on the role of a network builder. This role involves developing linkages and connections within the company and beyond.

== Motivations for employees ==
Edstrom and Galbraith (1977) were amongst the first to theorise on the differing objectives of international assignments. Suutari and Brewster (2000) are also key academics in the International Human Resource Management field. Their research has focused on the motivations for accepting international assignment. Traditionally, international assignments have been undertaken for perceived financial gain or for internal career progression in the organisation. Recent research shows that "only half of those who accepted international assignments had international career orientations". The remaining half accepted out of a "sense of duty to the organisation or to boost their income". Restrictive gender roles in certain cultures results in female executives being less lively to accept or be offered international assignments. Some employees may only accept an international assignment based on the level of support offered by HR. International assignments are a complex mission that involve dealing with certain procedures or legalities such as immigration, expatriate tax and social security. Employees are more likely to accept an international assignment if there is a strong level of help and direction in dealing with the complexities of the mission. Other factors that can influence an employee's motivation include location, compensation package, and host country benefits.

The importance of an adequate selection of individuals for international assignments was reviewed by Caligiuri and coworkers in 2009.

== Repatriation ==
Repatriation is the process of placing the international assignee back into the parent organisation following the completion of the overseas mission. Some MNCs and organisations have established practices and services to support the return of an employee however research shows that repatriate turnover is a growing challenge. This is because the number of international assignments is increasing and is predicted to increase even more in the next five years. Employee retention following an international assignment is a major human resource capital challenge for MNCs. A recent survey shows that only 35% of the 205 organisations surveyed placed importance on "finding a suitable position for the employee post assignment". Unsuccessful repatriation can occur when employees are placed in a role that does not utilise the skills they developed on the international assignment. This can often lead to a wide variety of issues including career transitions, lack of empowerment and psychological stress. In today's globalised context, organisations place greater focus on the selection of assignees than on repatriation.

== See also ==
- Expatriates in the United Arab Emirates
