= Cross-cultural competence =

Cross-cultural competence refers to the knowledge, skills, and affect/motivation that enable individuals to adapt effectively in cross-cultural environments. Cross-cultural competence is defined here as an individual capability that contributes to intercultural effectiveness regardless of the particular intersection of cultures. The concept may overlap to that of so-called cultural agility. Although some aspects of cognition, behavior, or affect may be particularly relevant in a specific country or region, evidence suggests that a core set of competencies enables adaptation to any culture (Hammer, 1987). Cultural diversity is a learned behavior highly influenced by values, beliefs, and religion shared by a group of people and passed from one generation to another (Mulholland, 1991)

Cross-cultural competence is not an end in itself, but is a set of variables that contribute to intercultural effectiveness. Whereas previous models have tended to emphasize subjective outcomes, focusing primarily on adjustment, outcomes of interest here include both subjective and objective outcomes. Objective outcomes, such as job performance, have been addressed in previous research, but to a lesser degree than subjective outcomes. Research indicates that the outcomes are linked, with personal and interpersonal adjustment linked to work adjustment, which has been linked with job performance (Shay & Baack, 2006). However, these relationships are small, and some research has demonstrated that subjective outcomes can diverge from objective outcomes (Kealey, 1989), with expatriates sometimes showing relatively poor adjustment but high effectiveness in their organizational role.

It's a double-edged sword regarding cross-cultural teams affecting team performance.

Positive Evidence: An individual's absorptive capacity, or their potential to identify, integrate, and use outside information, is likely to be enhanced by worker heterogeneity and a more extensive knowledge base. (Levinthal and Cohen, 1990). Negative Evidence: Language obstacles or misconceptions may arise as a result of diversity, making it difficult for people to communicate and negatively impacting the productivity of the business (Lazear, Basset-Jones, 2005). Workplace cohesiveness, satisfaction, turnover, and cross-group contacts are all impacted by an organization's culture, and these factors can eventually affect task distribution, hiring practices, and overall performance (Reskin, McBrier, and Kmec, 1999).

Here's a three-step approach which can be integrated into organisations smoothly:-

1. Hiring Actual Diversity: Recruiters/Managers should pay attention to deep-level characteristics rather than surface-level ones to maximize team creativity and innovation. (Hülsheger et al., 2009; van Dijk et al., 2012).

2. Deploying Diversity: Companies must realize cultural diversity is not always a strategic asset unless it is mobilized and applied in a way that sets the company apart from its rivals. For example, a person's skill in speaking Farsi as a second language would constitute a human capital resource for a specific unit that operates where translations to or from that language are relevant to the unit's performance. (Nyberg et al., 2014; Ployhart & Moliterno, 2011)

3. Pragmatic Diversity Management: Managers need to be aware of how tasks and teams are designed. For example, numerous cross-cultural teams function remotely and are geographically scattered. Regular usage of rich media like video conferencing may enhance interpersonal connections and communication. Increasing in-person interactions is also necessary to foster trust and improve team member comfort levels to allow the use of a variety of viewpoints and knowledge. Organizations can give multicultural teams training sessions to help members develop their cross-cultural cooperation and communication abilities.

== See also ==
- Intercultural competence
- Transcultural Psychiatry
- Acculturation
