= Cross Cultural & Strategic Management =

- Discipline: Cross-cultural and strategic management
- Language: English
- Edited by: Rosalie L. Tung

Publication details
- Former name: Cross Cultural Management
- History: 1994-present
- Publisher: Emerald Group Publishing
- Frequency: Quarterly
- Impact factor: 2.619 (2018)

Standard abbreviations
- ISO 4: Cross Cult. Strateg. Manag.

Indexing
- ISSN: 2059-5794

Links
- Journal homepage; Online access; Editorial team

Cross Cultural & Strategic Management is a peer-reviewed academic journal that publishes papers in the field of cross-cultural management and strategic management. The journal's editor is Rosalie L. Tung (Simon Fraser University). It has been in publication since 1994 and, until year-end 2015, was titled Cross Cultural Management: An International Journal.

== Journal scope and aims ==
Cross Cultural & Strategic Management (CCSM) publishes research on cross-cultural and strategic management in the global context. CCSM is interdisciplinary in nature, and welcomes research from scholars from the fields of international business, management, and other disciplines including anthropology, economics, political science, and sociology.

== Abstracting and indexing ==
Cross Cultural & Strategic Management is abstracted and indexed in, amongst others: SCOPUS, and the Social Sciences Citation Index. According to the Journal Citation Reports, its 2018 impact factor is 2.619.
