= Translation project =

A translation project is a project that deals with the activity of translating.

From a technical point of view, a translation project is closely related to the project management of the translation process. But, from an intercultural point of view, a translation project is much more complex; this becomes evident, for instance, when considering Bible translation or other literary translation projects.

Translation scholars such as Antoine Berman defend the views that every translator shall develop their own translation project, adhere to it and, later, develop translation criticism. Every translator can only be faithful to their own translation project.

PMP researcher Mandy Sha argue that for survey translation where a team approach is recommended, project managers and researchers who do not speak the language of the translation still have a key role in improving the translation because they know the study objectives well and the intent behind the questions.

== See also ==
- Cultural translation
- Skopos theory
- Translation
- Translation studies
- Translation criticism
- Literary translation
- Untranslatability

== Bibliography ==
- Keiran J. Dunne; Elena S. Dunne (2011). Translation and Localization Project Management:The Art of the Possible. American Translators Association Scholarly Monograph Series. John Benjamins Publishing Company. ISBN 978-90-272-3192-5.
- Matis Nancy (2014). How to manage your translation projects. Translation of the French book "Comment gérer vos projets de traduction". Matis Nancy, edi.pro 2010. e-book.
