= Retranslation =

Translating a work that has previously been translated into the same language

Retranslation refers to the action of "translating a work that has previously been translated into the same language" or to the text itself that was retranslated. Retranslation of classic literature and religious texts is common. Retranslation may happen for many reasons—e.g., to update obsolete language, improve translation quality, account for a revised edition of the source text, or a desire to present a new interpretation or creative response to a text. This is most common in poetry and drama.

The translation scholar Lawrence Venuti has argued that texts with very great cultural authority, including "the Bible, [...] the Homeric epics, Dante's Divine Comedy, Shakespeare's plays, or the Miguel de Cervantes novel Don Quixote, are likely to prompt retranslation because different readerships in the receiving culture may have different interpretations, and may want to apply their own values to the text." The translation historian Anthony Pym distinguishes between passive retranslations that respond to changes in the receiving language and culture, and active retranslations carried out to oppose rival translations.

Retranslation is common in subtitling. It is less common in dubbing and the response from viewers is not always positive.

== Different ways of using the term ==
The term 'retranslation' has been used to mean various things, including indirect translation, also known as relay translation, where a text is translated into one language and then that translation is translated into a further language. In translation studies, the accepted meaning is now as a new translation into the same target language of a previously translated work. The traditional conceptualization holds that the process is linear or chronological, with retranslation always taking place after the first translation. Modern usage, however, does not always imply this and may be demonstrated in the following examples:

- Retranslations occurring simultaneously or near-simultaneously so that it is difficult to determine the first from succeeding translations.
- Retranslations produced in the same language but different markets such as French and French Canadian.
- Retranslations made on the assumption that previous translations are not acceptable.

== Retranslation hypothesis ==
An implicit retranslation hypothesis can be attributed to Goethe's 1819 claim that three kinds of translation are required. The first, a "simple prosaic rendering" is able to surprise with what is new. The second is placed "in the context of the foreign country" but requires representations in terms of the receiving culture. And in the third, the translator “sacrifices, to a greater or lesser degree, the distinctiveness of their own tradition”, coming as close to the foreign work as possible. Goethe then recognizes that these three kinds need not necessarily follow each other: "in every literature, those three modes or phases of translating repeat, reverse themselves, or take effect at the same time."

From this, the British translation scholar Andrew Chesterman extracts an explicit retranslation hypothesis as follows: "Goethe's three phases can be reduced to a dual opposition between 'freer earlier' and 'closer later'."

In a 1990 issue of the translation journal Palimpsestes, Paul Bensimon and Antoine Berman also lean on Goethe when arguing that the first translation of a text into a given language tends to adapt the text to the norms and conventions of the target language and culture, while the later translations tend to stay closer to the original because if a text is translated again it is because its status in the new culture has prompted a second (or further) translation. For Berman, "retranslating is necessary because translations age, and because none is the translation".

The hypothesis has been tested by a number of subsequent scholars who have suggested that it is too simplistic. In an article on retranslation in Finland, Paloposki and Koskinen argue that although many retranslations do conform to Berman and Bensimon's model, "There are no inherent qualities in the process of retranslating that would dictate a move from domesticating strategies towards more foreignising strategies."

In a review of retranslation research since 1990, Peeters and Van Poucke argue that Chesterman's formulation of the retranslation hypothesis is reductive with respect to Berman's original claims and that many further aspects of retranslation need exploration.

== Well-known retranslations ==
The first translation by H.M. Parshley in 1953 of Simone de Beauvoir's 1949 book The Second Sex (Le Deuxième Sexe), has been much criticised. A new translation by Constance Borde and Sheila Malovany-Chevalier appeared in 2009 and many critics felt it was a more accurate representation of de Beauvoir's text. As some commentators have pointed out, however, when a translation has been enormously influential it can be hard to argue that it is somehow a failure.

Many classic Russian novels have been translated a number of times; in recent years Richard Pevear and Larissa Volokhonsky have produced well-received retranslations of works including Dostoevsky's The Brothers Karamazov and The Idiot, and Leo Tolstoy's War and Peace and Anna Karenina. Translations of Russian novels are often compared to early influential, but widely criticised, versions by Constance Garnett.

A new translation of Grimms' Fairy Tales appeared in 2014, entitled The Original Folk and Fairy Tales of the Brothers Grimm and published by Princeton University Press. The editor and translator was Jack Zipes, who included all 156 stories from the first editions of 1812 and 1915, many of which were omitted from later editions and translations because of their disturbing subject matter. The new translation revealed the extent to which previous translations had been censored, or based on censored source texts.

== Retranslations in other media ==
The 2008 Swedish film Let the Right One In (Swedish: Låt den rätte komma in) was released on DVD in the United States with subtitles different from those seen in movie theaters. This led to a number of complaints and the theatrical subtitles were restored to later issues of the DVD.

Timur Bekmambetov's 2004 film Night Watch appeared in cinemas with specially designed subtitles that blended with the action. When the film was released on DVD, some viewers were disappointed to find that these subtitles had been replaced with more conventionally formatted subtitles.

The subtitler Lenny Borger, who resubtitled a number of French classics for Rialto Pictures – including La grande illusion, Rififi and Children of Paradise – believed that "[a] film is like a novel: you have to translate it for each new generation".
