= Pour une critique des traductions: John Donne =

Pour une critique des traductions: John Donne is a posthumous book by Antoine Berman, published in 1995.

Published posthumously in France, develops an original concept of “criticism of translation” and a methodology to anchor the practice of this criticism. The work of translation is a critical process as well as a creative one. Moving away from nonsystematic evaluative approaches that focus on the shortcomings of translations or the normative approaches that study the cultural and literary systems into which the translations are inserted, Berman applies the notion of ethics he developed in his earlier works, calling for a translation that is nonethnocentric and stipulating that the creativity required by translation be focused on the re-creation of the original in the other language without being over-determined by the personal poetics of the writer-translator.

The book is divided into two parts, each focused on one element of the ethics of translation: theory (reflection) and practice (experience). In the first part Berman presents what he calls a general “productive criticism,” while in the second part he applies the general theoretical principles of this criticism to the analysis of the translations of John Donne’s work into French and Spanish.

This book has been influential in the field of translation studies in Latin America.

It was translated into English by Françoise Massardier-Kenney, Toward a Translation Criticism: John Donne. Kent, OH: Kent State University Press, 2009.
