= Indirect translation =

Translation of a translation

Indirect translation is a translation of a translation. It may be based on a translated version, or multiple translated versions, of the original or ultimate source text. For instance, if a text in Arabic is translated into Portuguese via English, the result is an indirect translation.

Indirect translation is a long-standing reality of intercultural exchanges, especially associated with those exchanges involving geographically, culturally and linguistically distant communities (e.g. Chinese-Portuguese translation) or the so-called small languages (e.g. Catalan, Czech, Danish). It remains a common translation practice in various areas of today's society, e.g. audio-visual, computer-assisted and literary translation, localization, or community and conference interpreting. Currently, its use is often linked to globalization or the practice of international organizations, where a high number of working languages often entails editing documents via the linguae francae or other mediating languages.

In Translation Studies indirect translation – sometimes referred to by the abbreviations "IT" or "ITr" – is also known as "double, intermediate, mediated, mixed, pivot, relay(ed), or second (third, etc.)-hand translation". Indirect translations are sometimes called retranslations, but this term is more frequently used to describe multiple translations of the same source text into one target language. Indirect translation is opposed to direct translation, which is a translation made directly from the ultimate source text, without a mediating text.

== Examples ==
=== In literary translation ===
Until the 1990s Russian classics had only been translated into European Portuguese via French rather than directly from Russian (e.g. José Saramago's translation of Leo Tolstoy's Anna Karenina via French in 1959).

Another telling example is the first Russian translation of the Arabic One Thousand and One Nights, by Alexey Filatov in 1763–1771. It was based on a French translation produced by Antoine Galland in 1717. Later Russian translations were also based on European editions. For instance, the translation by Yulia Doppelmayr (1889–1890) was based on Galland's text and the translation by Lyudmila Shelgunova (1894) was based on an English translation by Edward William Lane (1838 to 1840).

=== In audio-visual translation ===
In the television show Breaking Bad, particularly the third episode of the third season, the Tortuga character speaks Spanish and the Polish subtitles (fansubs) are made from the English mediating subtitles.

=== In translation of religious texts ===
A direct translation of the Qur'an into Latin was made in 1142–1143; many indirect translations into European vernaculars were based on that Latin version.

The English Bible (c. 1385) overseen by John Wycliffe used the Latin Vulgate as mediating text. The Vulgate derived from St. Jerome's Bible (c. 400), itself a Latin translation of mediating Greek sources.

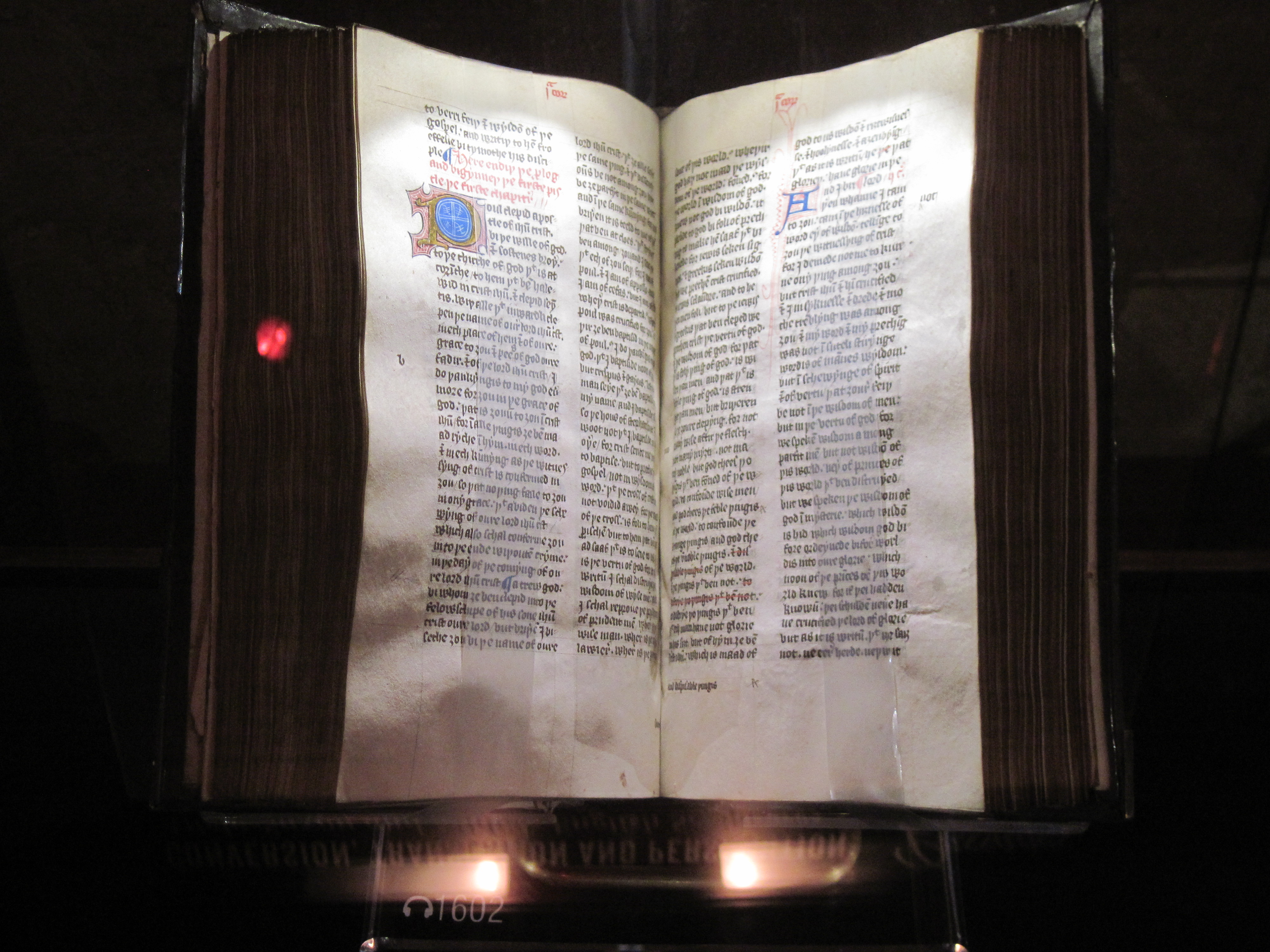
English indirect translation of Bible (c. 1385), overseen by John Wycliffe, used the Latin Vulgate as its source text.

=== In translation of manga and anime ===
It is a common practice in Russian scanlation to translate manga via English translations which are themselves indirect translations via Chinese. Russian unlicensed translations of anime are also commonly done via English translations. Because of that it should not be a surprise that in both cases transcription of Japanese words via English may be seen.

== Attitudes towards indirect translation ==
Indirect translation is heavily loaded with negative connotations. It is often considered as a poor copy of a copy, as in the Xerox effect where each successive passage through the photocopying process entails a loss of detail. Telling examples of this negative attitude towards indirect translation is the recommendation by UNESCO (1976) suggesting that indirect translation should be used "only where absolutely necessary" or the fact that it is often covert, i.e., not explicitly presented as such.

However, research has shown that recourse to indirect translation can also lead to positive results. Had it not been for this practice, certain literary works from peripheral or distant cultures would not have been disseminated in most languages and thus consecrated as world literature classics (or, at the very least, their consecration would have been delayed). Indirect translation may therefore be the most efficient, and sometimes the only, means of inclusion for cultural products from peripheral or distant cultures. Second, it has been claimed to be profitable to translation companies and clients alike, as it lowers translation expenses (it is often cheaper than translating directly from a small language). Third, it minimizes the risk of literary translation being rejected by editors familiar with the intermediate version. Last, it is claimed that some translation companies even prefer resorting to an intermediate version in a larger and more prestigious language in order to produce a translation from a distant culture, since that increases the chances of translation meeting reader or client expectations (as suggested by an ongoing study).

== See also ==
- Bible translation
- Literary translation
- Qu'ran translation
