= La traduction et la lettre ou l'auberge du lointain =

- Author: Antoine Berman
- Publication date: 1991

La traduction et la lettre ou l'auberge du lointain is a book by Antoine Berman, published in 1991.

== Overview ==
The author distinguishes between translating the letter and translating word for word, to avoid possible confusion between ‘word’ and ‘letter’. To illustrate this distinction, he uses the example of proverbs, where this distinction is not always clear. His point is that translation is a process of reflection that goes beyond the simple search for equivalence. Finding an equivalent means clearing the language of any obscurity of meaning and refusing to introduce anything foreign into it (dynamic equivalence according to Eugene Nida). Berman wants to escape from the traditional theory/practice dichotomy and replace it with experience (in the Heideggerian sense) and reflection. Translation can thus be an experience of reflection and a reflection on the experience of translation. This is what gives translation its specificity, making it a discipline in its own right (translation studies), not a sub-discipline. He defines it as a ‘conscious articulation of the experience of translation’ and also as ‘the reflection of translation on itself based on its nature as an experience.’

This is an inspired book, both raw and refined. In this work, it is clear that Antoine Berman's thinking is developed, tested and constantly reworked, in a movement that is not only dialectical but also dialogical, a permanent confrontation between the near and the far, developed in solitude but with the aim of creating a community around him. This is a paradigmatic text which, in addition to having achieved classic status, clearly sets out Berman's eccentric position in the panorama of different studies on translation.

== Translations ==
- La traducción y la letra o el albergue de lo lejano, Spanish version by Ignacio Rodríguez. Buenos Aires: Dedalus Editores, 2014. ISBN 978-987-28200-5-3.
