= L'âge de la traduction =

L'âge de la traduction. "La tâche du traducteur" de Walter Benjamin, un commentaire is a book by Antoine Berman, compiled by his widow Isabelle and published in 2008.
