= Translation criticism =

Evaluation of translated work

Translation criticism is the systematic study, evaluation, and interpretation of different aspects of translated works. It is an interdisciplinary academic field closely related to literary criticism and translation theory. It includes marking of student translations, and reviews of published translations.

== Concept ==
The concept itself of "translation criticism" has the following meanings:

1. Quality assessment of the target text, especially of its semantic and pragmatic equivalence regarding the source text.
2. Assessment of the proceeding followed by the translator in order to translate the text.
3. Part of translation science dealing basically with:
  - nature and aims of translation criticism,
  - considering the problems of translation criticism,
  - defining valid criteria and proceedings for criticizing translation regarding its aims.

Translation criticism falls within the field of translation studies and some view it as less "scholarly" than the pure branch of this discipline. However, it is noted that it is not merely a subjective concern because of the recognition that value judgments play a part in the translation field. Scholars stress the importance of objective translation criticism, which pertains to the criticism of a translation that is defined explicitly and verified by examples.

== Overview ==
One of the goals of translation criticism is to raise awareness of the delicacy involved in translation and to explore whether the translator has achieved their goals or not. Whether or not translation criticism should be considered a separate field of inquiry from translation theory is a matter of some controversy.

The translation professionals and laymen who engage in literary translation inevitably face the issue of translation quality. Translation criticism has several open issues, such as the name for the practice of evaluating translations, and the criteria for evaluation, each of which merits a detailed study.

A literary text may be explored as a translation, not primarily to judge it, but to understand where the text stands in relation to its original by examining the interpretative potential that results from the translational choices that have been made. When comparing different translations from a same original text, the results of the analyses should be used to construct a hypothesis about each translation: criteria such as "divergent similarity", "relative divergence", "radical divergence" and "adaptation" are important for such an analysis.

A very influential author in the field was Antoine Berman, who claimed that there may be many different methods for translation criticism as there are many translation theories; therefore he entitled a model of his own as an analytical path, which can be modulated according to the specific objectives of each analyst and adapted to all standardized text types. He further insists that every translator shall develop first a translation project, prior to the translation process itself.

Although a debatable subject it can be said that translation criticism is required. For instance, in Turkey, since the establishment of the Translation Bureau in 1940, the Turkish literary system has been extensively enriched by translations from various languages and the translation activity has been evaluated by writers, translators and critics. A methodology for descriptive translation studies was put forward by Gideon Toury. In it he suggests that translators should constantly take decisions during the translation process. In short, scholars working within this paradigm have claimed that translations should be described in accordance with the target norms that are valid at a specific time and place and compared with their original ones in order to produce an objective translation criticism supported by translation theory (Toury 1980: 73).

== See also ==
- Comparative literature
- Cultural studies
- Cultural translation
- Literary criticism
- Literary translation
- Translation
- Translation project
- Translation studies
- Untranslatability

== Bibliography ==
- Berman, Antoine, Pour une critique des traductions: John Donne. Paris: Gallimard, 1995. Translated into English by Françoise Massardier-Kenney as Toward a Translation Criticism: John Donne. Kent, OH: Kent State University Press, 2009.
- García Yebra, Valentín, En torno a la traducción. Madrid, Gredos, 1983.
- Newmark, Peter, A Textbook of Translation. Chapter 17: "Translation Criticism". Prentice-Hall International, 1988. ISBN 978-0139125935
- Reiss, Katharina, Möglichkeiten und Grenzen der Übersetzungskritik: Kategorien und Kriteren für eine sachgerechte Beurteilung von Übersetzungen. Munich, Hueber, 1971. Translated into English by Erroll. F. Rhodes as Translation Criticism: The Potentials and Limitations. Categories and Criteria for Translation Quality Assessment. St. Jerome Publishing Ltd, 2000.
