= Françoise Massardier-Kenney =

Françoise Massardier-Kenney is a translator and translation scholar.

She is the former director of the Institute for Applied Linguistics and Emerita Professor of Modern and Classical Language Studies at Kent State University. Her scholarly work includes serving as the general editor of the American Translators Association Scholarly Monograph Series and co-editor in chief of George Sand Studies.

She has translated Antoine Berman's Pour une critique des traductions: John Donne into English with the title Toward a Translation Criticism: John Donne. This work is influential in the field of translation criticism.
