= Antoine Berman =

French translator

Antoine Berman (French: [bɛʁman]; 24 June 1942 – 22 November 1991) was a French translator, philosopher, historian and theorist of translation.

== Life ==
Antoine Berman was born in the small town of Argenton-sur-Creuse, near Limoges, to a Polish-Jewish father and a French-Yugoslav mother. After living in hiding during the Second World War, the family settled near Paris. Berman attended the Lycée Montmorency. Later he studied philosophy at the University of Paris, where he met his wife Isabelle. In 1968, they moved to Argentina where they remained for five years. On their return to Paris, Berman directed a research program and taught several seminars at the Collège international de philosophie (International College of Philosophy) in Paris, and published his major theoretical work, L'Epreuve de l'étranger (The Experience of the Foreign) in 1984. He died in 1991, at age 49, writing his last book in bed.

== Work ==
Antoine Berman's "trials of the foreign", which originates from German Romanticism (especially Friedrich Schleiermacher), tries to show the "deforming tendencies" inherent in the act of (literary) translation.

Berman's 'twelve deforming tendencies' in translation were:

- Rationalisation
- Clarification
- Expansion
- Ennoblement
- Qualitative impoverishment
- Quantitative impoverishment
- The destruction of rhythms
- The destruction of underlying networks of signification
- The destruction of linguistic patternings
- The destruction of vernacular network or their exoticisation
- The destruction of expressions and idioms
- The effacement of the superimposition of languages

Lawrence Venuti, an American translation theorist, has used Berman's concepts to write a genealogy of translation in an Anglo-American context to introduce the "foreignizing" strategy that is normatively suppressed in mainstream translation.

== Influence ==
Berman was active in philosophical and literary circles, nevertheless he has been influential in translatology, especially in translation criticism. He claimed that there may be many different methods for translation criticism as there are many translation theories; therefore he entitled a model of his own as an analytical path, which can be modulated according to the specific objectives of each analyst and adapted to all standardized text types.

== Books ==
- Moi, le Suprême (translation of Augusto Roa Bastos' Yo, el supremo). Pierre Belfond, Le Livre De Poche, Buenos Aires, 1979
- L'épreuve de l'étranger: Culture et traduction dans l'Allemagne romantique: Herder, Goethe, Schlegel, Novalis, Humboldt, Schleiermacher, Hölderlin. Paris: Gallimard, 1984. Translated into English by Stefan Heyvaert as The Experience of the Foreign: Culture and Translation in Romantic Germany. Albany: SUNY Press, 1992
- Lettres à Fouad El-Etr sur le romantisme allemand. Paris: PUF, 1991
- Pour une critique des traductions: John Donne. Paris: Gallimard, 1995. Translated into English by Françoise Massardier-Kenney as Toward a Translation Criticism: John Donne. Kent, OH: Kent State University Press, 2009
- La traduction et la lettre, ou l'auberge du lointain. Paris: Seuil, 1999
- L'âge de la traduction. "La tâche du traducteur" de Walter Benjamin, un commentaire. Presses Universitaires de Vincennes, 2008. Translated into English by Chantal Wright as The Age of Translation. Abingdon: Routledge, 2018

== Bibliography ==
- Berman, Antoine (1999). La Traduction-poésie. Edited by Martine Broda. Strasbourg: Presses Universitaires de Strasbourg.
- Nouss, Alexis (2001). Antoine Berman, aujourd'hui (Antoine Berman for our time). Montréal: Université McGill.
- Davreu, Robert. Antoine Berman, penseur de la traduction
- Hareau, Eliane; Sclavo, Lil (2018). El traductor, artífice reflexivo. Montevideo. ISBN 978-9974-93-195-4. Archived from the original on 2019-04-24.
- Farrokhi, Mahdi (2009). Les oeuvres complètes d’Antoine Berman. Étude bibliographique. (A full bibliography.) In Equivalences 36:1-2, pp. 183–197. https://www.persee.fr/doc/equiv_0751-9532_2009_num_36_1_1424
