= Translation =

Transfer of the meaning of something in one language into another

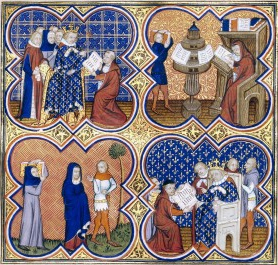
King Charles V the Wise commissions a translation of Aristotle. First square shows his ordering the translation; second square, the translation being made. Third and fourth squares show the finished translation being brought to, and then presented to, the King.

Translation, in reference to language, is the communication of the meaning of a source-language text by means of an equivalent target-language text. The English language draws a terminological distinction (which does not exist in all languages) between translating written texts and interpreting oral or signed communications between languages.

A translator always risks inadvertently introducing source-language words, grammar, or syntax into the target-language rendering. Such "spill-overs", however, have sometimes imported useful source-language calques and loanwords that have enriched target languages.

Since the 1940s, efforts have been made, with varying degrees of success, to automate translation or to mechanically aid the human translator. More recently, the rise of the Internet has fostered a world-wide market for translation services and has facilitated "language localisation".

== Etymology ==
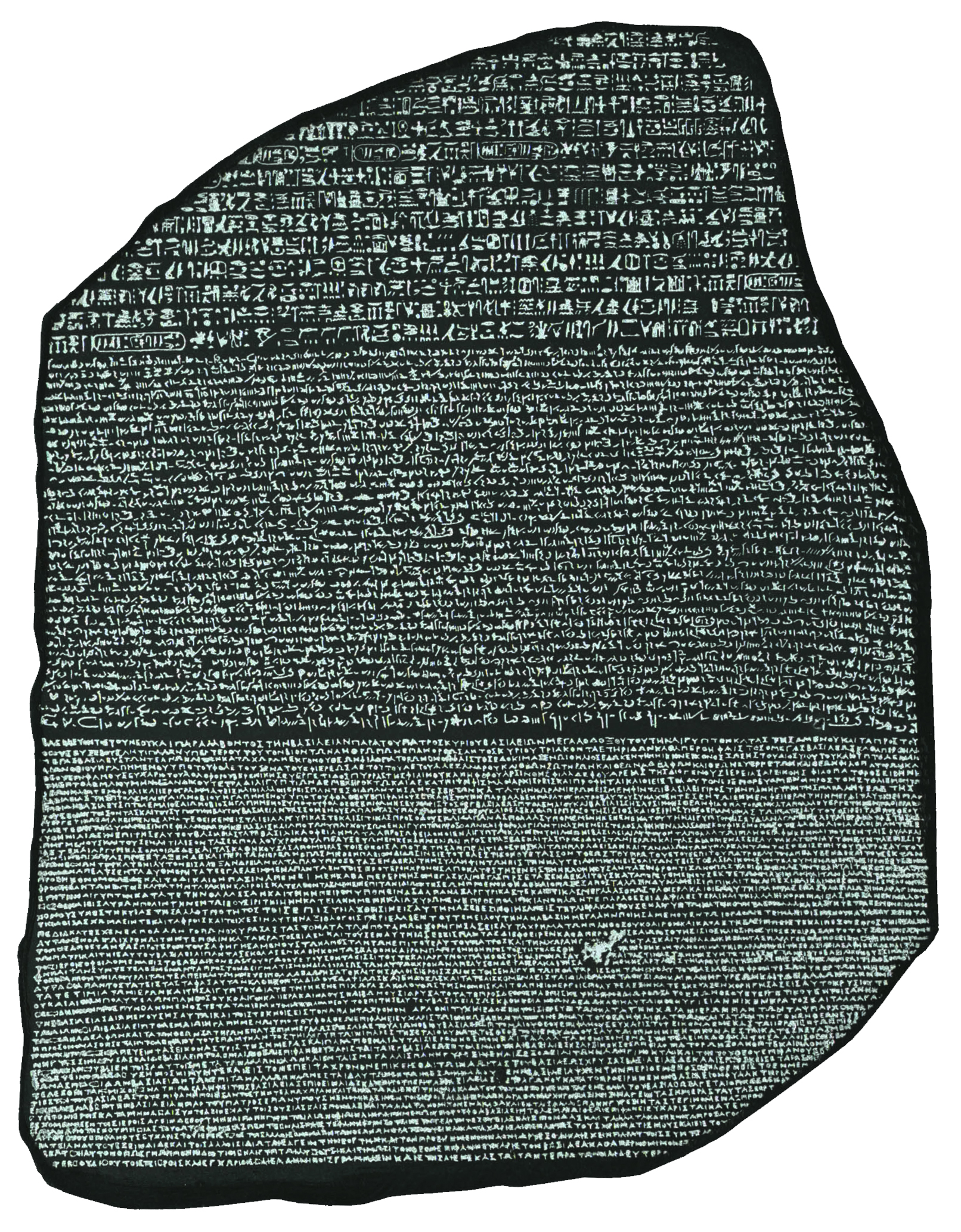
The Rosetta Stone, a symbol of the art of translation

The word for the concept of "translation", in English and some other European languages, stems from the Latin noun translatio, formed from the adverb trans, "across", and -latio, derived from latus, the past participle of the verb ferre, to "carry" or "bring". Thus, the Latin noun translatio and its cognate modern derivatives mean the "bringing across" (i.e., the transferring) of a text from one language to another.

In some other European languages, the word for the concept of "translation" stems from another Latin noun, trāductiō, derived from the verb trādūcō, "bring across", formed from the adverb trans, "across", and dūcō, to "lead" or "bring".

The Ancient Greek term for "translation" (metaphrasis, "a speaking across") has supplied English with "metaphrase" (word-for-word translation), as contrasted with "paraphrase" (rephrasing in other words, from paraphrasis). "Metaphrase" corresponds in one of the more recent terminologies to formal equivalence, and "paraphrase" to dynamic equivalence.

The concept of metaphrase (i.e., word-for-word translation) is imperfect, because a given word in a given language often carries more than one meaning, and because a similar given meaning may often be represented in a given language by more than one word. Nevertheless, metaphrase and paraphrase may be useful as ideal concepts that mark the extremes in the spectrum of possible approaches to translation.

See also the entry for translation at Wiktionary.

== Theories ==
=== Western theory ===
Discussions of the theory and practice of translation reach back into antiquity and show remarkable continuities. The ancient Greeks distinguished between metaphrase (literal translation) and paraphrase. This distinction was adopted by English poet and translator John Dryden (1631–1700), who described translation as the judicious blending of these two modes of phrasing when selecting, in the target language, "counterparts", or equivalents, for the expressions used in the source language:

When [words] appear... litterally graceful, it were an injury to the Authour that they should be chang'd. But since... what is Beautiful in one [language] is often Barbarous, nay sometimes Nonsence, in another, it would be unreasonable to limit a Translator to the narrow compass of his Authour's words: 'tis enough if he choose out some Expression which does not vitiate the Sense.

Dryden cautioned, however, against the licence of "imitation", i.e. of adapted translation: "When a painter copies from the life... he has no privilege to alter features and lineaments..."

This general formulation of the central concept of translation—equivalence—is as adequate as any that has been proposed since Cicero and Horace, who, in 1st-century-BCE Rome, famously and literally cautioned against translating word for word (verbum pro verbo).

Despite occasional theoretical diversity, the actual practice of translation has hardly changed since antiquity. Except for some extreme metaphrasers in the early Christian period and the Middle Ages and adapters in various periods (especially pre-Classical Rome, and the 18th century), translators have generally shown prudent flexibility in seeking equivalents—"literal" where possible, paraphrastic where necessary—for the original meaning and other crucial "values" (e.g., style, verse form, concordance with musical accompaniment or, in films, with speech articulatory movements) as determined from context.

In general, translators have sought to preserve the context itself by reproducing the original order of sememes, and hence word order—when necessary, reinterpreting the actual grammatical structure, for example, by shifting from active to passive voice, or vice versa. The grammatical differences between "fixed-word-order" languages (e.g. English, French, German) and "free-word-order" languages (e.g., Greek, Latin, Polish, Russian) have been no impediment in this regard. The particular syntax (sentence-structure) characteristics of the text of a source language are adjusted to the syntactic requirements of the target language.

When a target language has lacked terms that are found in a source language, translators have borrowed those terms, thereby enriching the target language. Thanks in great measure to the exchange of calques and loanwords between languages, and to their importation from other languages, there are few concepts that are "untranslatable" among the modern European languages. A greater problem, however, is translating terms relating to cultural concepts that have no equivalent in the target language. For full comprehension, such situations require the provision of a gloss.

Generally, the greater the contact and exchange that have existed between two languages, or between those languages and a third one, the greater is the ratio of metaphrase to paraphrase that may be used in translating among them. However, due to shifts in ecological niches of words, a common etymology is sometimes misleading as a guide to current meaning in one or the other language. For example, the English actual should not be confused with the cognate French actuel ("present", "current"), the Polish aktualny ("present", "current," "topical", "timely", "feasible"), the Swedish aktuell ("topical", "presently of importance"), the Russian актуальный ("urgent", "topical") or the Dutch actueel ("current").

The translator's role as a bridge for "carrying across" values between cultures has been discussed at least since Terence, the 2nd-century-BCE Roman adapter of Greek comedies. The translator's role is, however, by no means a passive, mechanical one, and so has also been compared to that of an artist. The main ground seems to be the concept of parallel creation found in critics such as Cicero. Dryden observed that "Translation is a type of drawing after life..." Comparison of the translator with a musician or actor goes back at least to Samuel Johnson's remark about Alexander Pope playing Homer on a flageolet, while Homer himself used a bassoon.

The translator of the Bible into German, Martin Luther (1483–1546), is credited with being the first European to posit that one translates satisfactorily only toward his own language. L. G. Kelly states that, since Johann Gottfried Herder in the 18th century, "it has been axiomatic" that one translates only toward his own language.

Compounding the demands on the translator is the fact that no dictionary or thesaurus can ever be a fully adequate guide in translating. The Scottish historian Alexander Tytler, in his Essay on the Principles of Translation (1790), emphasized that assiduous reading is a more comprehensive guide to a language than are dictionaries. The same point, but also including listening to the spoken language, had earlier, in 1783, been made by the Polish poet and grammarian Onufry Kopczyński.

=== Other traditions ===
Due to Western colonialism and cultural dominance in recent centuries, Western translation traditions have largely replaced other traditions. The Western traditions draw on both ancient and medieval traditions, and on more recent European innovations.

Though earlier approaches to translation are less commonly used today, they retain importance when dealing with their products, as when historians view ancient or medieval records to piece together events which took place in non-Western or pre-Western environments. Also, though heavily influenced by Western traditions and practiced by translators taught in Western-style educational systems, Chinese and related translation traditions retain some theories and philosophies unique to the Chinese tradition.

==== Near East ====
Traditions of translating material among the languages of ancient Egypt, Mesopotamia, Assyria (Syriac language), Anatolia, and Israel (Hebrew language) go back several millennia. There exist partial translations of the Sumerian Epic of Gilgamesh (c. 2000 BCE) into Southwest Asian languages of the second millennium BCE.

An early example of a bilingual document is the 1274 BCE Treaty of Kadesh between the ancient Egyptian and Hittie empires.

The Babylonians were the first to establish translation as a profession.

The first translations of Greek and Coptic texts into Arabic, possibly indirectly from Syriac translations, seem to have been undertaken as early as the late seventh century CE.

The second Abbasid Caliph funded a translation bureau in Baghdad in the eighth century.

Bayt al-Hikma, the famous library in Baghdad, was generously endowed and the collection included books in many languages; it became a leading centre for the translation of works from antiquity into Arabic, with its own Translation Department.

Translations into European languages from Arabic versions of lost Greek and Roman texts began in the middle of the eleventh century, when the benefits to be gained from the Arabs’ knowledge of the classical texts were recognised by European scholars, particularly after the establishment of the Toledo School of Translators in Spain.

William Caxton’s Dictes or Sayengis of the Philosophres (Sayings of the Philosophers, 1477) was a translation into English of an eleventh-century Egyptian text which reached English via translation into Latin and then French.

The translation of foreign works for publishing in Arabic was revived by the establishment of the Madrasat al-Alsun (School of Tongues) in Egypt in 1813.

==== Asia ====
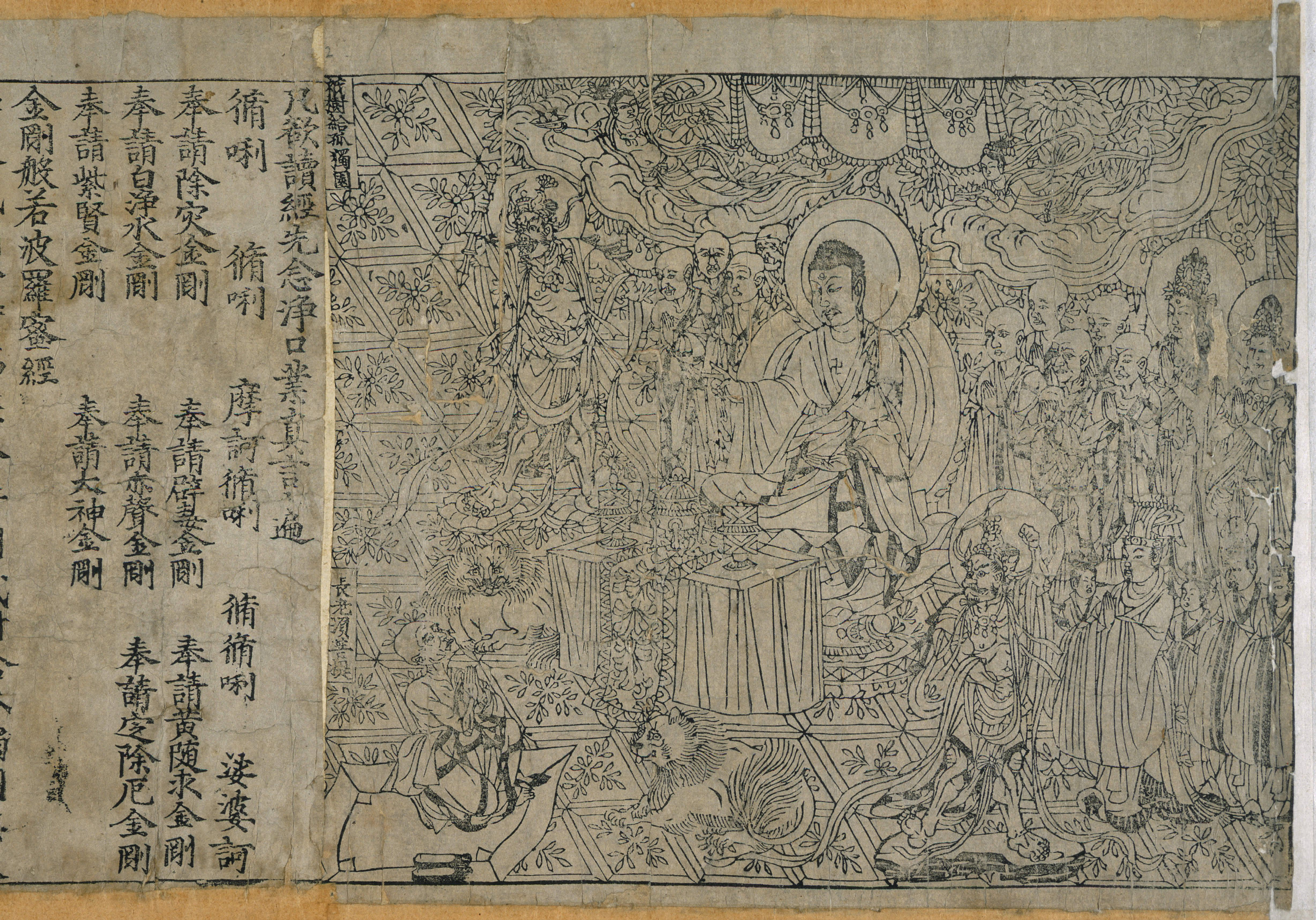
Buddhist Diamond Sutra, translated into Chinese by Kumārajīva – world's oldest known dated printed book (868 CE)

There is a separate tradition of translation in South, Southeast and East Asia (primarily of texts from the Indian and Chinese civilizations), connected especially with the rendering of religious, particularly Buddhist, texts and with the governance of the Chinese empire. Classical Indian translation is characterized by loose adaptation, rather than the closer translation more commonly found in Europe; and Chinese translation theory identifies various criteria and limitations in translation.

In the East Asian sphere of Chinese cultural influence, more important than translation per se has been the use and reading of Chinese texts, which also had substantial influence on the Japanese, Korean and Vietnamese languages, with substantial borrowings of Chinese vocabulary and writing system. Notable is the Japanese kanbun, a system for glossing Chinese texts for Japanese speakers.

Though Indianized states in Southeast Asia often translated Sanskrit material into the local languages, the literate elites and scribes more commonly used Sanskrit as their primary language of culture and government.

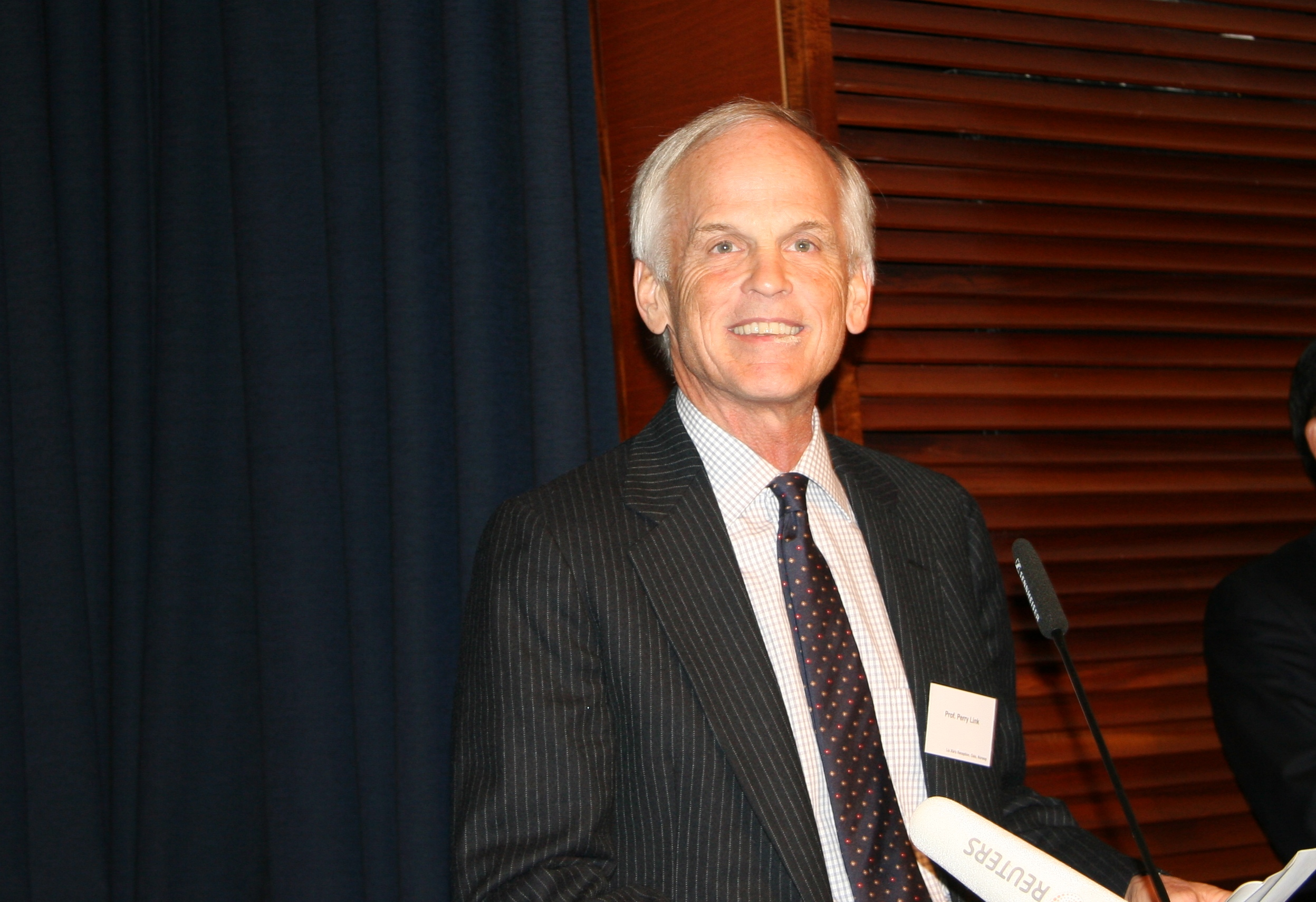
Perry Link

Some special aspects of translating from Chinese are illustrated in Perry Link's discussion of translating the work of the Tang dynasty poet Wang Wei (699–759 CE).

Some of the art of classical Chinese poetry [writes Link] must simply be set aside as untranslatable. The internal structure of Chinese characters has a beauty of its own, and the calligraphy in which classical poems were written is another important but untranslatable dimension. Since Chinese characters do not vary in length, and because there are exactly five characters per line in a poem like [the one that Eliot Weinberger discusses in 19 Ways of Looking at Wang Wei (with More Ways)], another untranslatable feature is that the written result, hung on a wall, presents a rectangle. Translators into languages whose word lengths vary can reproduce such an effect only at the risk of fatal awkwardness.... Another imponderable is how to imitate the 1-2, 1-2-3 rhythm in which five-syllable lines in classical Chinese poems normally are read. Chinese characters are pronounced in one syllable apiece, so producing such rhythms in Chinese is not hard and the results are unobtrusive; but any imitation in a Western language is almost inevitably stilted and distracting. Even less translatable are the patterns of tone arrangement in classical Chinese poetry. Each syllable (character) belongs to one of two categories determined by the pitch contour in which it is read; in a classical Chinese poem the patterns of alternation of the two categories exhibit parallelism and mirroring.

Most of the difficulties, according to Link, arise in addressing the second problem, "where the impossibility of perfect answers spawns endless debate". Almost always at the center is the letter-versus-spirit dilemma. At the literalist extreme, efforts are made to dissect every conceivable detail about the language of the original Chinese poem. "The dissection, though," writes Link, "normally does to the art of a poem approximately what the scalpel of an anatomy instructor does to the life of a frog."

Chinese characters, in avoiding grammatical specificity, offer advantages to poets (and, simultaneously, challenges to poetry translators) that are associated primarily with absences of subject, number, and tense.

It is the norm in classical Chinese poetry, and common even in modern Chinese prose, to omit subjects; the reader or listener infers a subject. The grammars of some Western languages, however, require that a subject be stated (although this is often avoided by using a passive or impersonal construction). Most of the translators cited in Eliot Weinberger's 19 Ways of Looking at Wang Wei supply a subject. Weinberger points out, however, that when an "I" as a subject is inserted, a "controlling individual mind of the poet" enters and destroys the effect of the Chinese line. Without a subject, he writes, "the experience becomes both universal and immediate to the reader." Another approach to the subjectlessness is to use the target language's passive voice; but this again particularizes the experience too much.

Nouns have no number in Chinese. "If," writes Link, "you want to talk in Chinese about one rose, you may, but then you use a "measure word" to say "one blossom-of roseness."

Chinese verbs are tense-less; there are several ways to specify when something happened or will happen, but verb tense is not one of them. For poets, this creates the great advantage of ambiguity. According to Link, Weinberger's insight about subjectlessness—that it produces an effect "both universal and immediate"—applies to timelessness as well.

Link proposes a kind of uncertainty principle that may apply not only to translation from the Chinese language, but to all translation:

Dilemmas about translation do not have definitive right answers (although there can be unambiguously wrong ones if misreadings of the original are involved). Any translation (except machine translation, a different case) must pass through the mind of a translator, and that mind inevitably contains its own store of perceptions, memories, and values. Weinberger [...] pushes this insight further when he writes that "every reading of every poem, regardless of language, is an act of translation: translation into the reader's intellectual and emotional life." Then he goes still further: because a reader's mental life shifts over time, there is a sense in which "the same poem cannot be read twice."

==== Islamic world ====
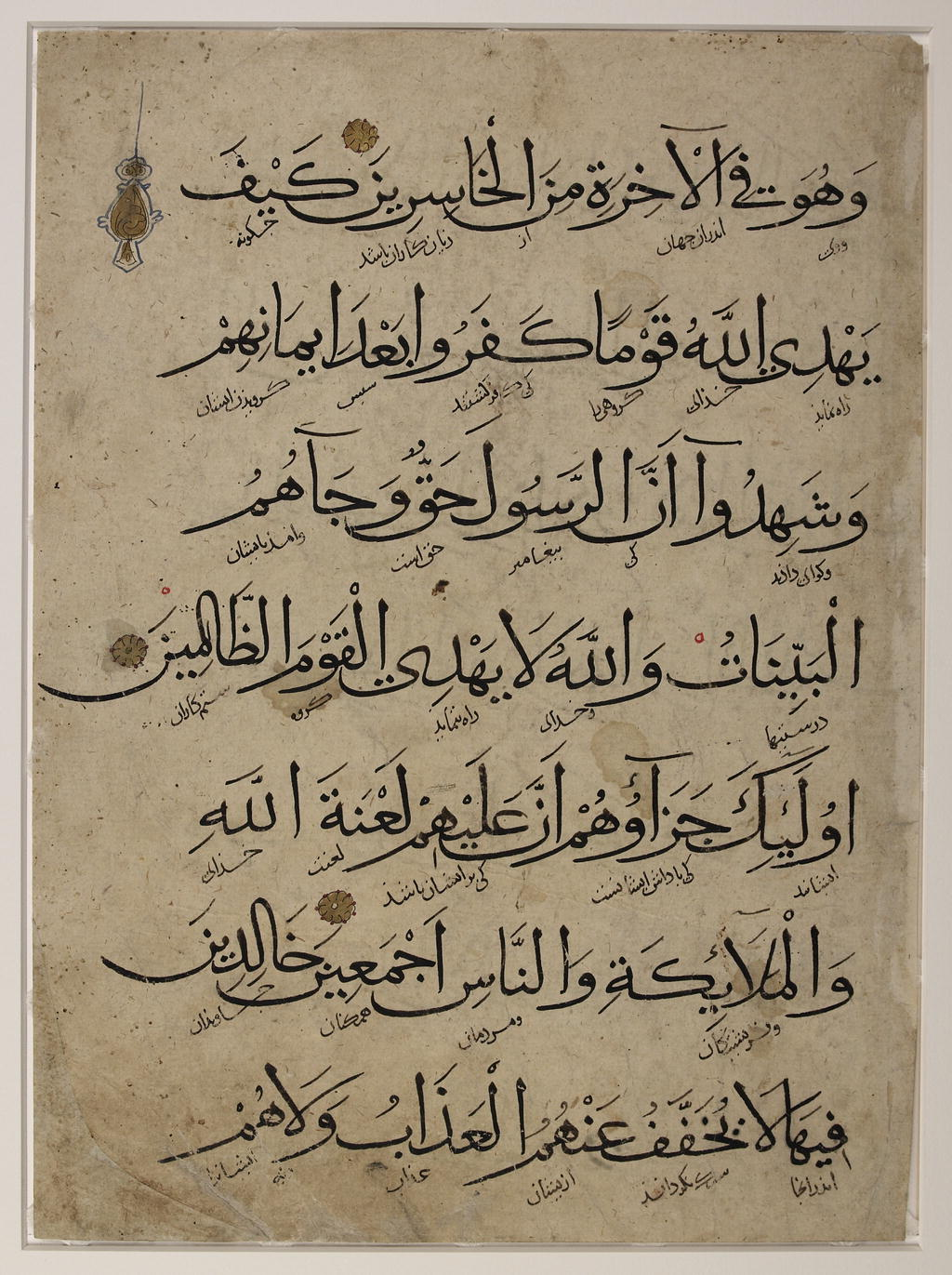
Qur'an in tawqi, with Persian translation (smaller words) in naskh (14th century)

Translation of material into Arabic expanded after the creation of Arabic script in the 5th century, and gained great importance with the rise of Islam and Islamic empires. Arab translation initially focused primarily on politics, rendering Persian, Greek, even Chinese and Indic diplomatic materials into Arabic. It later focused on translating classical Greek and Persian works, as well as some Chinese and Indian texts, into Arabic for scholarly study at major Islamic learning centers, such as the Al-Karaouine (Fes, Morocco), Al-Azhar (Cairo, Egypt), and the Nizamiyya of Baghdad. In terms of theory, Arabic translation drew heavily on earlier Near Eastern traditions as well as more contemporary Greek and Persian traditions.

Arabic translation efforts and techniques are important to Western translation traditions due to centuries of close contacts and exchanges. Especially after the Renaissance, Europeans began more intensive study of Arabic and Persian translations of classical works as well as scientific and philosophical works of Arab and oriental origins. Arabic, and to a lesser degree Persian, became important sources of material and perhaps of techniques for revitalized Western traditions, which in time would overtake the Islamic and oriental traditions.

In the 19th century, after the Middle East's Islamic clerics and copyists

had conceded defeat in their centuries-old battle to contain the corrupting effects of the printing press, [an] explosion in publishing ... ensued. Along with expanding secular education, printing transformed an overwhelmingly illiterate society into a partly literate one.

In the past, the sheikhs and the government had exercised a monopoly over knowledge. Now an expanding elite benefitted from a stream of information on virtually anything that interested them. Between 1880 and 1908... more than six hundred newspapers and periodicals were founded in Egypt alone.

The most prominent among them was al-Muqtataf ... [It] was the popular expression of a translation movement that had begun earlier in the century with military and medical manuals and highlights from the Enlightenment canon. (Montesquieu's Considerations on the Romans and Fénelon's Telemachus had been favorites.)

A translator who contributed mightily to the advance of the Islamic Enlightenment was the Egyptian cleric Rifaa al-Tahtawi (1801–73), who had spent five years in Paris in the late 1820s, teaching religion to Muslim students. After returning to Cairo with the encouragement of Muhammad Ali (1769–1849), the Ottoman viceroy of Egypt, al–Tahtawi became head of the new school of languages and embarked on an intellectual revolution by initiating a program to translate some two thousand European and Turkish volumes, ranging from ancient texts on geography and geometry to Voltaire's biography of Peter the Great, along with the Marseillaise and the entire Code Napoléon. This was the biggest, most meaningful importation of foreign thought into Arabic since Abbasid times (750–1258).

In France al-Tahtawi had been struck by the way the French language... was constantly renewing itself to fit modern ways of living. Yet Arabic has its own sources of reinvention. The root system that Arabic shares with other Semitic tongues such as Hebrew is capable of expanding the meanings of words using structured consonantal variations: the word for airplane, for example, has the same root as the word for bird.

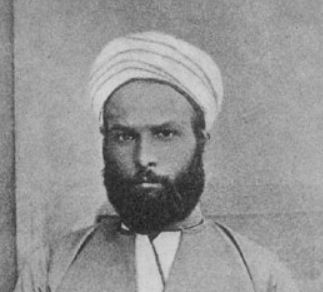
Muhammad Abduh

The movement to translate English and European texts transformed the Arabic and Ottoman Turkish languages, and new words, simplified syntax, and directness came to be valued over the previous convolutions. Educated Arabs and Turks in the new professions and the modernized civil service expressed skepticism, writes Christopher de Bellaigue, "with a freedom that is rarely witnessed today ... No longer was legitimate knowledge defined by texts in the religious schools, interpreted for the most part with stultifying literalness. It had come to include virtually any intellectual production anywhere in the world." One of the neologisms that, in a way, came to characterize the infusion of new ideas via translation was "darwiniya", or "Darwinism".

One of the most influential liberal Islamic thinkers of the time was Muhammad Abduh (1849–1905), Egypt's senior judicial authority—its chief mufti—at the turn of the 20th century and an admirer of Darwin who in 1903 visited Darwin's exponent Herbert Spencer at his home in Brighton. Spencer's view of society as an organism with its own laws of evolution paralleled Abduh's ideas.

After World War I, when Britain and France divided up the Middle East's countries, apart from Turkey, between them, pursuant to the Sykes-Picot agreement—in violation of solemn wartime promises of postwar Arab autonomy—there came an immediate reaction: the Muslim Brotherhood emerged in Egypt, the House of Saud took over the Hijaz, and regimes led by army officers came to power in Iran and Turkey. "[B]oth illiberal currents of the modern Middle East," writes de Bellaigue, "Islamism and militarism, received a major impetus from Western empire-builders." As often happens in countries undergoing social crisis, the aspirations of the Muslim world's translators and modernizers, such as Muhammad Abduh, largely had to yield to retrograde currents.

== Fidelity and transparency ==
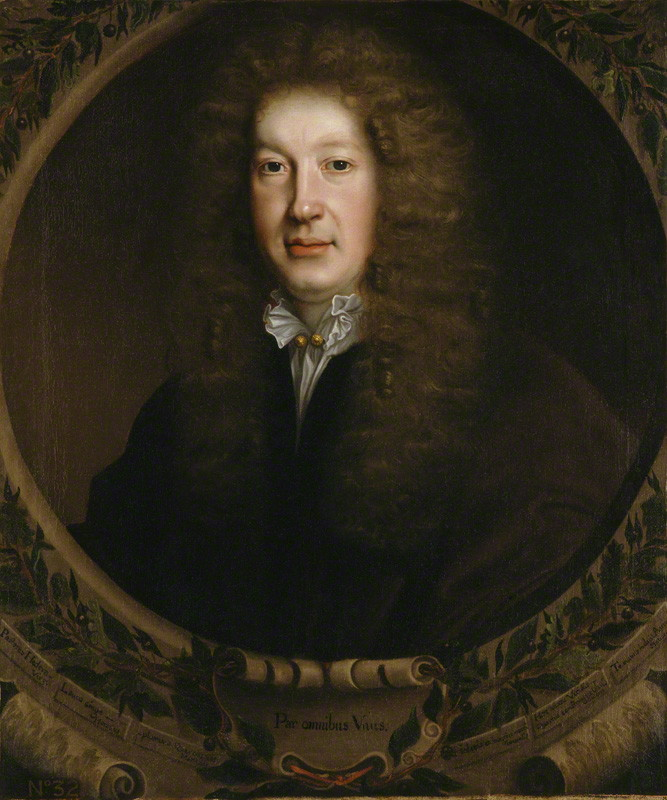
Dryden

Fidelity (or "faithfulness") and felicity (or transparency) are often (though not always) at odds. A 17th-century French critic coined the phrase "les belles infidèles" to suggest that translations can be either faithful or beautiful, but not both. (Note: French philosopher and writer Gilles Ménage (1613-92) commented on translations by humanist Perrot Nicolas d'Ablancourt (1606-64): "They remind me of a woman whom I greatly loved in Tours, who was beautiful but unfaithful.") Fidelity is the extent to which a translation accurately renders the meaning of the source text, without distortion. Transparency is the extent to which a translation appears to a native speaker of the target language to have originally been written in that language, and conforms to its grammar, syntax and idiom. John Dryden (1631–1700) wrote in his preface to the translation anthology Sylvae:

Where I have taken away some of [the original authors'] Expressions, and cut them shorter, it may possibly be on this consideration, that what was beautiful in the Greek or Latin, would not appear so shining in the English; and where I have enlarg'd them, I desire the false Criticks would not always think that those thoughts are wholly mine, but that either they are secretly in the Poet, or may be fairly deduc'd from him; or at least, if both those considerations should fail, that my own is of a piece with his, and that if he were living, and an Englishman, they are such as he wou'd probably have written.

A translation that meets the criterion of fidelity (faithfulness) is said to be "faithful"; a translation that meets the criterion of transparency, "idiomatic". Depending on the given translation, the two qualities may not be mutually exclusive. The criteria for judging the fidelity of a translation vary according to the subject, type and use of the text, its literary qualities, its social or historical context, etc. The criteria for judging the transparency of a translation appear more straightforward: an unidiomatic translation "sounds wrong" and, in extreme cases of word-for-word translation, often results in patent nonsense.

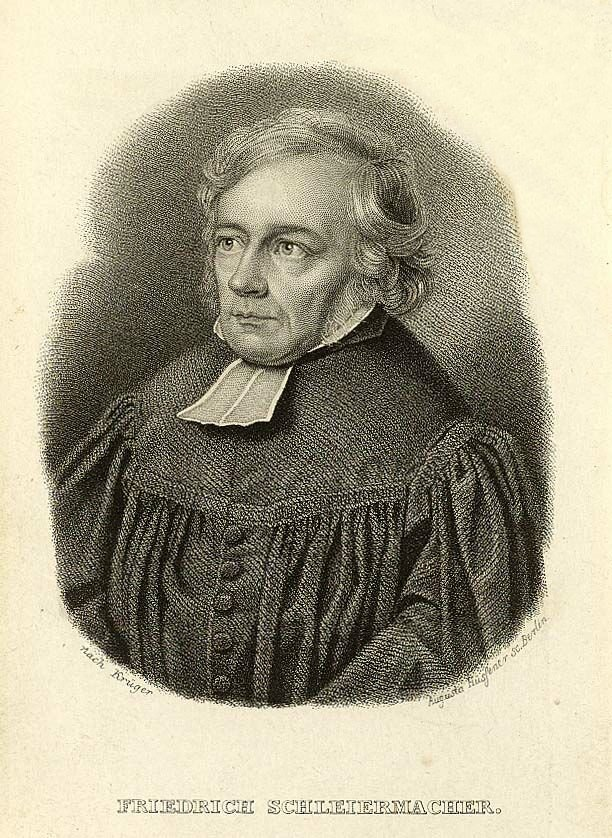
Schleiermacher

Nevertheless, in certain contexts a translator may consciously seek to produce a literal translation. Translators of literary, religious, or historic texts often adhere as closely as possible to the source text, stretching the limits of the target language to produce an unidiomatic text. Also, a translator may adopt expressions from the source language to provide "local color".

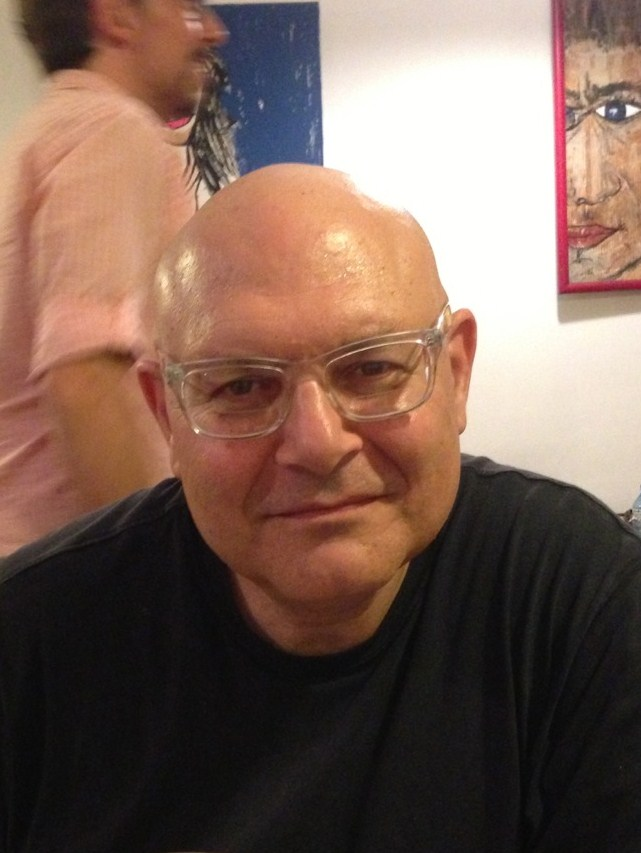
Venuti

While current Western translation practice is dominated by the dual concepts of "fidelity" and "transparency", this has not always been the case. There have been periods, especially in pre-Classical Rome and in the 18th century, when many translators stepped beyond the bounds of translation proper into the realm of adaptation. Adapted translation retains currency in some non-Western traditions. The Indian epic, the Ramayana, appears in many versions in the various Indian languages, and the stories are different in each. Similar examples are to be found in medieval Christian literature, which adjusted the text to local customs and mores.

Many non-transparent-translation theories draw on concepts from German Romanticism, the most obvious influence being the German theologian and philosopher Friedrich Schleiermacher. In his seminal lecture "On the Different Methods of Translation" (1813) he distinguished between translation methods that move "the writer toward [the reader]", i.e., transparency, and those that move the "reader toward [the author]", i.e., an extreme fidelity to the foreignness of the source text. Schleiermacher favored the latter approach.

In recent decades, prominent advocates of such "non-transparent" translation have included the French scholar Antoine Berman, who identified twelve deforming tendencies inherent in most prose translations, and the American theorist Lawrence Venuti, who has called on translators to apply "foreignizing" rather than domesticating translation strategies.

=== Dynamic and formal equivalence ===
The question of fidelity vs. transparency has also been formulated in terms of, respectively, "formal equivalence" and "dynamic [or functional] equivalence" – expressions associated with the translator Eugene Nida and originally coined to describe ways of translating the Bible; but the two approaches apply to any translation.

"Formal equivalence" corresponds to "metaphrase", and "dynamic equivalence" to "paraphrase". "Formal equivalence" (sought via "literal" translation) attempts to render the text literally, or "word for word" (the latter expression being itself a word-for-word rendering of the classical Latin verbum pro verbo) – if necessary, at the expense of features natural to the target language. By contrast, "dynamic equivalence" (or "functional equivalence") conveys the essential thoughts expressed in a source text—if necessary, at the expense of literality, original sememe and word order, the source text's active vs. passive voice, etc.

There is, however, no sharp boundary between formal and functional equivalence. On the contrary, they represent a spectrum of translation approaches. Each is used at various times and in various contexts by the same translator, and at various points within the same text – sometimes simultaneously. Competent translation entails the judicious blending of formal and functional equivalents.

Common pitfalls in translation, especially when practiced by inexperienced translators, involve false equivalents such as "false friends" and false cognates.

=== Source and target languages ===
In the practice of translation, the source language is the language being translated from, while the target language – also called the receptor language – is the language being translated into. Difficulties in translating can arise from lexical and syntactical differences between the source language and the target language, which differences tend to be greater between two languages belonging to different language families.

Often the source language is the translator's second language, while the target language is the translator's first language. In some geographical settings, however, the source language is the translator's first language because not enough people speak the source language as a second language. For instance, a 2005 survey found that 89% of professional Slovene translators translate into their second language, usually English. In cases where the source language is the translator's first language, the translation process has been referred to by various terms, including "translating into a non-mother tongue", "translating into a second language", "inverse translation", "reverse translation", "service translation", and "translation from A to B". The process typically begins with a full and in-depth analysis of the original text in the source language, ensuring full comprehension and understanding before the actual act of translating is approached.

Translation for specialized or professional fields requires a working knowledge, as well, of the pertinent terminology in the field. For example, translation of a legal text requires not only fluency in the respective languages but also familiarity with the terminology specific to the legal field in each language.

While the form and style of the source language often cannot be reproduced in the target language, the meaning and content can. Linguist Roman Jakobson went so far as to assert that all cognitive experience can be classified and expressed in any living language. Linguist Ghil'ad Zuckermann suggests that the limits are not of translation per se but rather of elegant translation.

==== Source and target texts ====
In translation, a source text (ST) is a text written in a given source language which is to be, or has been, translated into another language, while a target text (TT) is a translated text written in the intended target language, which is the result of a translation from a given source text. According to Jeremy Munday's definition of translation, "the process of translation between two different written languages involves the changing of an original written text (the source text or ST) in the original verbal language (the source language or SL) into a written text (the target text or TT) in a different verbal language (the target language or TL)". The terms 'source text' and 'target text' are preferred over 'original' and 'translation' because they do not have the same positive vs. negative value judgment.

Translation scholars including Eugene Nida and Peter Newmark have represented the different approaches to translation as falling broadly into source-text-oriented or target-text-oriented categories.

==== Back-translation ====
A "back-translation" is a translation of a translated text back into the language of the original text, made without reference to the original text. Comparison of a back-translation with the original text is sometimes used as a check on the accuracy of the original translation, much as the accuracy of a mathematical operation is sometimes checked by reversing the operation. However, the results of such reverse-translation operations, while useful as approximate checks, are not always precisely reliable. Back-translation must in general be less accurate than back-calculation because linguistic symbols (words) are often ambiguous, whereas mathematical symbols are intentionally unequivocal.

In the context of machine translation, a back-translation is also called a "round-trip translation." When translations are produced of material used in medical clinical trials, such as informed-consent forms, a back-translation is often required by the ethics committee or institutional review board.

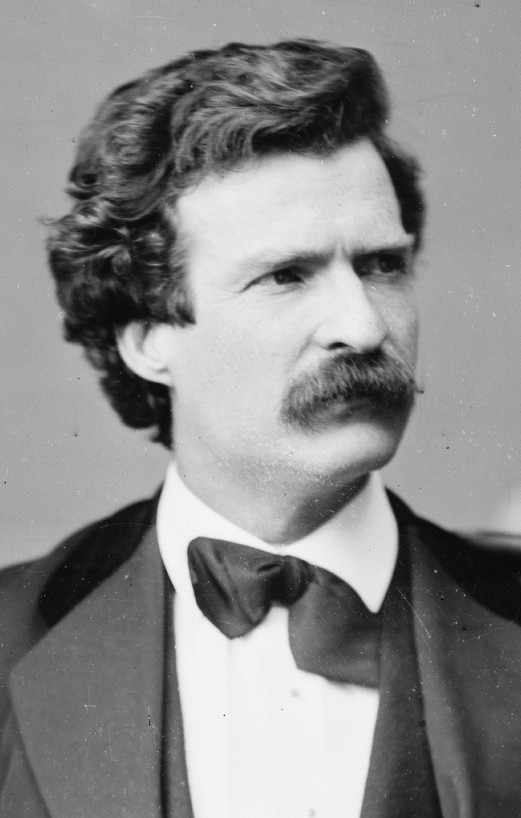
In 1903, Mark Twain back-translated his own short story, "The Celebrated Jumping Frog of Calaveras County".

Mark Twain provided humorously telling evidence for the frequent unreliability of back-translation when he issued his own back-translation of a French translation of his short story, "The Celebrated Jumping Frog of Calaveras County". He published his back-translation in a 1903 volume together with his English-language original, the French translation, and a "Private History of the 'Jumping Frog' Story". The latter volume included a synopsized adaptation of his story that Twain stated had appeared, unattributed to Twain, in a Professor Sidgwick's Greek Prose Composition (p. 116) under the title, "The Athenian and the Frog"; the adaptation had for a time been taken for an independent ancient Greek precursor to Twain's "Jumping Frog" story.

When a document survives only in translation, the original having been lost, researchers sometimes undertake back-translation in an effort to reconstruct the original text. An example involves the novel The Saragossa Manuscript by the Polish aristocrat Jan Potocki (1761–1815), who wrote the novel in French and anonymously published fragments in 1804 and 1813–14. Portions of the original French-language manuscript were subsequently lost; however, the missing fragments survived in a Polish translation, made by Edmund Chojecki in 1847 from a complete French copy that has since been lost. French-language versions of the complete Saragossa Manuscript have since been produced, based on extant French-language fragments and on French-language versions that have been back-translated from Chojecki's Polish version.

Many works by the influential Classical physician Galen survive only in medieval Arabic translation. Some survive only in Renaissance Latin translations from the Arabic, thus at a second remove from the original. To better understand Galen, scholars have attempted back-translation of such works to reconstruct the original Greek.

When historians suspect that a document is actually a translation from another language, back-translation into that hypothetical original language can provide supporting evidence by showing that such characteristics as idioms, puns, peculiar grammatical structures, etc., are in fact derived from the original language. For example, the known text of the Till Eulenspiegel folk tales is in High German but contains puns that work only when back-translated to Low German. This seems clear evidence that these tales (or at least large portions of them) were originally written in Low German and translated into High German by an over-metaphrastic translator.

Supporters of Aramaic primacy—the view that the Christian New Testament or its sources were originally written in the Aramaic language—seek to prove their case by showing that difficult passages in the existing Greek text of the New Testament make much more sense when back-translated to Aramaic: that, for example, some incomprehensible references are in fact Aramaic puns that do not work in Greek. Due to similar indications, it is believed that the 2nd-century Gnostic Gospel of Judas, which survives only in Coptic, was originally written in Greek.

John Dryden (1631–1700), the dominant English-language literary figure of his age, illustrates, in his use of back-translation, translators' influence on the evolution of languages and literary styles. Dryden is believed to be the first person to posit that English sentences should not end in prepositions because Latin sentences cannot end in prepositions. Dryden created the proscription against "preposition stranding" in 1672 when he objected to Ben Jonson's 1611 phrase, "the bodies that those souls were frighted from", though he did not provide the rationale for his preference. Dryden often translated his writing into Latin, to check whether his writing was concise and elegant, Latin being considered an elegant and long-lived language with which to compare; then he back-translated his writing to English according to Latin-grammar usage. As Latin does not have sentences ending in prepositions, Dryden may have applied Latin grammar to English, thus forming the controversial rule of no sentence-ending prepositions, subsequently adopted by other writers. (Note: Cf. a supposed comment by Winston Churchill: "This is the type of pedantry up with which I will not put.")

== Translators ==
A language is not merely a collection of words and of rules of grammar and syntax for generating sentences, but also a vast interconnecting system of connotations and cultural references whose mastery, writes linguist Mario Pei, "comes close to being a lifetime job."

Michael Wood, a Princeton University emeritus professor, writes: "[T]ranslation, like language itself, involves contexts, conventions, class, irony, posture and many other regions where speech acts hang out. This is why it helps to compare translations [of a given work]."

Emily Wilson, a professor of classical studies at the University of Pennsylvania and herself a translator, writes:

[I]t is [hard] to produce a good literary translation. This is certainly true of translations of ancient Greek and Roman texts, but it is also true of literary translation in general: it is very difficult. Most readers of foreign languages are not translators; most writers are not translators. Translators have to read and write at the same time, as if always playing multiple instruments in a one-person band. And most one-person bands do not sound very good.

When in 1921, three years before his death, the English-language novelist Joseph Conrad— who had long had little contact with everyday spoken Polish—attempted to translate into English Bruno Winawer's short Polish-language play, The Book of Job, he predictably missed many crucial nuances of the contemporary Polish language.

The translator's role, in relation to the original text, has been compared to the roles of other interpretive artists, e.g., a musician or actor who interprets a work of musical or dramatic art. Translating, especially a text of any complexity (like other human activities), involves interpretation: choices must be made, which implies interpretation. (Note: "Interpretation" in this sense is to be distinguished from the function of an "interpreter" who translates orally or by the use of sign language.) (Note: Rebecca Armstrong writes: "A translator has to make choices; any word they choose will carry its own nuance, a particular set of interpretations, implications and associations. [Often the translator] need[s] to render the same [...] word differently in different contexts.") Mark Polizzotti writes: "A good translation offers not a reproduction of the work but an interpretation, a re-representation, just as the performance of a play or a sonata is a representation of the script or the score, one among many possible representations." A translation of a text of any complexity is—in and of itself, a work of art—unique and unrepeatable.

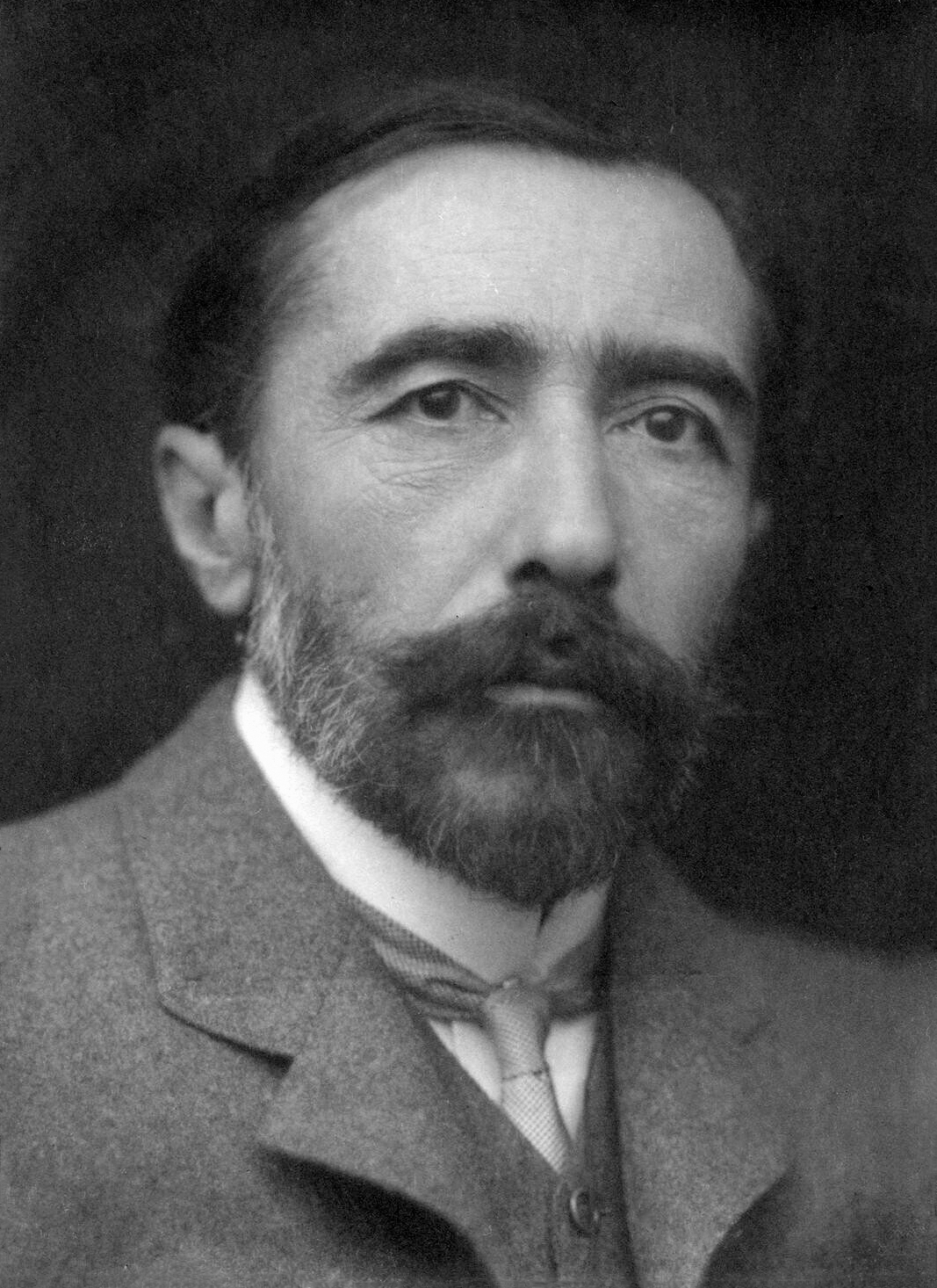
Joseph Conrad

Joseph Conrad, whose writings Zdzisław Najder has described as verging on "auto-translation" from Conrad's Polish and French linguistic personae, advised his niece and Polish translator Aniela Zagórska:

[D]on't trouble to be too scrupulous ... I may tell you (in French) that in my opinion il vaut mieux interpréter que traduire [it is better to interpret than to translate] ...Il s'agit donc de trouver les équivalents. Et là, ma chère, je vous prie laissez vous guider plutôt par votre tempérament que par une conscience sévère ... [It is, then, a question of finding the equivalent expressions. And there, my dear, I beg you to let yourself be guided more by your temperament than by a strict conscience....]"

Conrad advised another translator that the prime requisite for a good translation is that it be "idiomatic". "For in the idiom is the clearness of a language and the language's force and its picturesqueness—by which last I mean the picture-producing power of arranged words." Conrad thought C.K. Scott Moncrieff's English translation of Marcel Proust's À la recherche du temps perdu (In Search of Lost Time—or, in Scott Moncrieff's rendering, Remembrance of Things Past) to be preferable to the French original. (Note: See "Poetry", below, for a similar observation concerning the occasional superiority of the translation over the original.)

Emily Wilson writes that "translation always involves interpretation, and [requires] every translator... to think as deeply as humanly possible about each verbal, poetic, and interpretative choice."

Daniel Mendelsohn, a classicist at Bard College, has similarly said, in an interview, that

a lot of people, when they think about translation, think you sit down with a dictionary and look at the text and get going, but you really have to have an interpretation.... You need to make a decision. I don’t think there’s any translation that is not also an interpretation. There’s no such thing as an absolutely transparent translation.

Translation of other than the simplest brief texts requires painstakingly close reading of the source text and the draft translation, so as to resolve the ambiguities inherent in language and thereby to asymptotically approach the most accurate rendering of the source text.

Part of the ambiguity, for a translator, involves the structure of human language. Psychologist and neural scientist Gary Marcus notes that "virtually every sentence [that people generate] is ambiguous, often in multiple ways. Our brain is so good at comprehending language that we do not usually notice." An example of linguistic ambiguity is the "pronoun disambiguation problem" ("PDP"): a machine has no way of determining to whom or what a pronoun in a sentence—such as "he", "she" or "it"—refers. Such disambiguation is not infallible by a human, either.

Ambiguity is a concern both to translators and—as the writings of poet and literary critic William Empson have demonstrated—to literary critics. Ambiguity may be desirable, indeed essential, in poetry and diplomacy; it can be more problematic in ordinary prose.

Individual expressions – words, phrases, sentences – are fraught with connotations. As Empson demonstrates, any piece of language seems susceptible to "alternative reactions", or as Joseph Conrad once wrote, "No English word has clean edges." All expressions, Conrad thought, carried so many connotations as to be little more than "instruments for exciting blurred emotions."

Translators may render only parts of the original text, provided that they inform readers of that action. But a translator should not assume the role of censor and surreptitiously delete or bowdlerize passages merely to please a political or moral interest.

Translating has served as a school of writing for many an author, much as the copying of masterworks of painting has schooled many a novice painter. A translator who can competently render an author's thoughts into the translator's own language should certainly be able to adequately render, in his own language, any thoughts of his own. Translating (like analytic philosophy) compels precise analysis of language elements and of their usage. In 1946 the poet Ezra Pound, then at St. Elizabeth's Hospital, in Washington, D.C., advised a visitor, the 18-year-old beginning poet W.S. Merwin: "The work of translation is the best teacher you'll ever have." (Note: Elsewhere Merwin recalls Pound saying: "[A]t your age you don't have anything to write about. You may think you do, but you don't. So get to work translating. The Provençal is the real source....") Merwin, translator-poet who took Pound's advice to heart, writes of translation as an "impossible, unfinishable" art.

A translator acts as a bridge between two languages and cultures. When he has completed the first draft of a translation, he stands at the bridge's midpoint. Only after he has fully converted the vocabulary, idioms, grammar, and syntax of the source text to those of the target language does he arrive at the bridge's other end.

Translators, including monks who spread Buddhist texts in East Asia, and the early modern European translators of the Bible, in the course of their work have shaped the very languages into which they have translated. They have acted as bridges for conveying knowledge between cultures; and along with ideas, they have imported from the source languages, into their own languages, loanwords and calques of grammatical structures, idioms, and vocabulary.

=== Interpreting ===
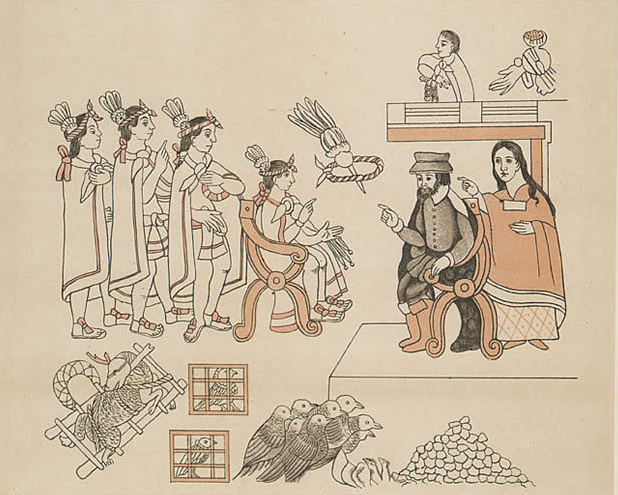
Hernán Cortés and La Malinche (right) meet Moctezuma II in Tenochtitlan, 8 November 1519.

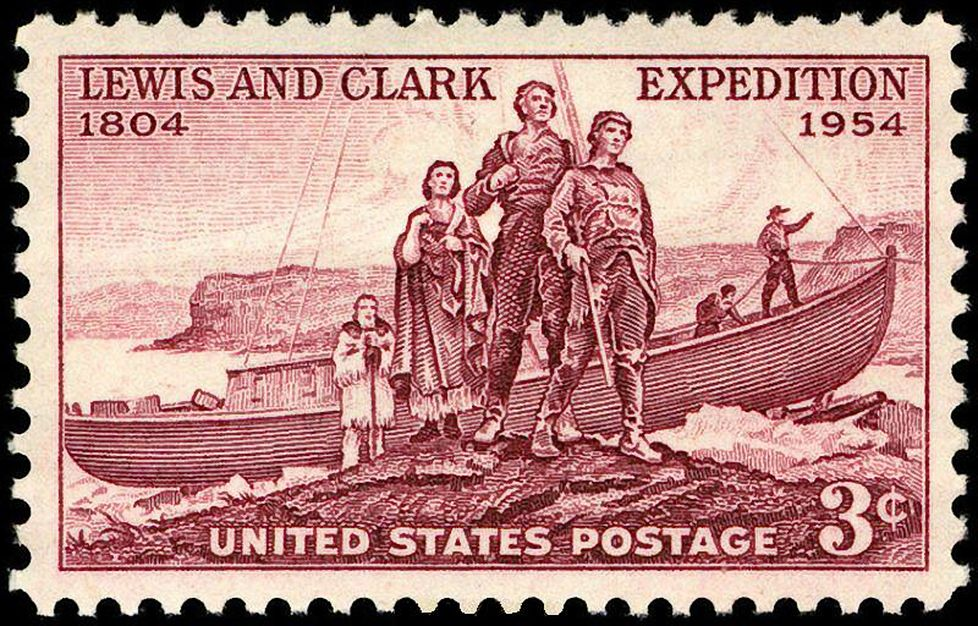
Lewis and Clark and their Native American interpreter, Sacagawea

Interpreting is the facilitation of oral or sign-language communication, either simultaneously or consecutively, between two, or among three or more, speakers who are not speaking, or signing, the same language. The term "interpreting," rather than "interpretation," is preferentially used for this activity by Anglophone interpreters and translators, to avoid confusion with other meanings of the word "interpretation."

Unlike English, many languages do not employ two separate words to denote the activities of written and live-communication (oral or sign-language) translators. (Note: For example, in Polish, a "translation" is "przekład" or "tłumaczenie." Both "translator" and "interpreter" are "tłumacz." For a time in the 18th century, however, for "translator," some writers used a word, "przekładowca," that is no longer in use.) Even English does not always make the distinction, frequently using "translating" as a synonym for "interpreting."

Interpreters have sometimes played crucial roles in human history. A prime example is La Malinche, also known as Malintzin, Malinalli and Doña Marina, an early-16th-century Nahua woman from the Mexican Gulf Coast. As a child she had been sold or given to Maya slave-traders from Xicalango, and thus had become bilingual. Subsequently, given along with other women to the invading Spaniards, she became instrumental in the Spanish conquest of Mexico, acting as interpreter, adviser, intermediary and lover to Hernán Cortés.

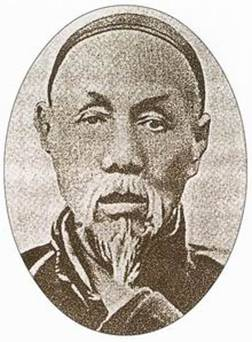
Lin Shu

Nearly three centuries later, in the United States, a comparable role as interpreter was played for the Lewis and Clark Expedition of 1804–6 by Sacagawea. As a child, the Lemhi Shoshone woman had been kidnapped by Hidatsa Indians and thus had become bilingual. Sacagawea facilitated the expedition's traverse of the North American continent to the Pacific Ocean.

The famous Chinese man of letters Lin Shu (1852 – 1924), who knew no foreign languages, rendered Western literary classics into Chinese with the help of his friend Wang Shouchang (王壽昌), who had studied in France. Wang interpreted the texts for Lin, who rendered them into Chinese. Lin's first such translation, 巴黎茶花女遺事 (Past Stories of the Camellia-woman of Paris – Alexandre Dumas, fils's La Dame aux Camélias), published in 1899, was an immediate success and was followed by many more translations from the French and the English.

=== Sworn translation ===
Sworn translation, also called "certified translation," aims at legal equivalence between two documents written in different languages. It is performed by someone authorized to do so by local regulations, which vary widely from country to country. Some countries recognize self-declared competence. Others require the translator to be an official state appointee. In some countries, such as the United Kingdom, certain government institutions require that translators be accredited by certain translation institutes or associations in order to be able to carry out certified translations.

=== Internet ===
Web-based human translation is generally favored by companies and individuals that wish to secure more accurate translations. In view of the frequent inaccuracy of machine translations, human translation remains the most reliable, most accurate form of translation available. With the recent emergence of translation crowdsourcing, translation memory techniques, and internet applications, translation agencies have been able to provide on-demand human-translation services to businesses, individuals, and enterprises.

While not instantaneous like its machine counterparts such as Google Translate and Babel Fish (now defunct), as of 2010 web-based human translation has been gaining popularity by providing relatively fast, accurate translation of business communications, legal documents, medical records, and software localization. Web-based human translation also appeals to private website users and bloggers. Contents of websites are translatable but URLs of websites are not translatable into other languages. Language tools on the internet provide help in understanding text.

=== Computer-assisted translation ===
Computer-assisted translation (CAT), also called "computer-aided translation," "machine-aided human translation" (MAHT) and "interactive translation," is a form of translation wherein a human translator creates a target text with the assistance of a computer program. The machine supports a human translator.

Computer-assisted translation can include standard dictionary and grammar software. The term, however, normally refers to a range of specialized programs available to the translator, including translation memory, terminology-management, concordance, and alignment programs.

These tools speed up and facilitate human translation, but they do not provide translation. The latter is a function of tools known broadly as machine translation. The tools speed up the translation process by assisting the human translator by memorizing or committing translations to a database (translation memory database) so that if the same sentence occurs in the same project or a future project, the content can be reused. This translation reuse leads to cost savings, better consistency and shorter project timelines.

== Machine translation ==
Machine translation (MT) is a process whereby a computer program analyzes a source text and, in principle, produces a target text without human intervention. In reality, however, machine translation typically does involve human intervention, in the form of pre-editing and post-editing. With proper terminology work, with preparation of the source text for machine translation (pre-editing), and with reworking of the machine translation by a human translator (post-editing), commercial machine-translation tools can produce useful results, especially if the machine-translation system is integrated with a translation memory or translation management system.

Unedited machine translation is publicly available through tools on the Internet such as Google Translate, Almaany, Babylon, DeepL Translator, and StarDict. These produce rough translations that, under favorable circumstances, approximate the meaning of the source text. With the Internet, translation software can help non-native-speaking individuals understand web pages published in other languages. Whole-page-translation tools are of limited utility, however, since they offer only a limited potential understanding of the original author's intent and context; translated pages tend to be more erroneously humorous and confusing than enlightening.

Interactive translations with pop-up windows are becoming more popular. These tools show one or more possible equivalents for each word or phrase. Human operators merely need to select the likeliest equivalent as the mouse glides over the foreign-language text. Possible equivalents can be grouped by pronunciation. Also, companies such as Ectaco produce pocket devices that provide machine translations.

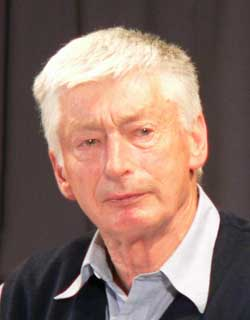
Claude Piron

Relying exclusively on unedited machine translation, however, ignores the fact that communication in human language is context-embedded and that it takes a person to comprehend the context of the original text with a reasonable degree of probability. It is certainly true that even purely human-generated translations are prone to error; therefore, to ensure that a machine-generated translation will be useful to a human being and that publishable-quality translation is achieved, such translations must be reviewed and edited by a human. (Note: J.M. Cohen observes: "Scientific translation is the aim of an age that would reduce all activities to techniques. It is impossible however to imagine a literary-translation machine less complex than the human brain itself, with all its knowledge, reading, and discrimination.") Claude Piron writes that machine translation, at its best, automates the easier part of a translator's job; the harder and more time-consuming part usually involves doing extensive research to resolve ambiguities in the source text, which the grammatical and lexical exigencies of the target language require to be resolved. Such research is a necessary prelude to the pre-editing necessary to provide input for machine-translation software, such that the output will not be meaningless.

The weaknesses of pure machine translation, unaided by human expertise, are those of artificial intelligence itself. As of 2018, professional translator Mark Polizzotti held that machine translation, by Google Translate and the like, was unlikely to threaten human translators anytime soon, because machines would never grasp nuance and connotation. Writes Paul Taylor: "Perhaps there is a limit to what a computer can do without knowing that it is manipulating imperfect representations of an external reality."

Gary Marcus notes that a so far insuperable stumbling block to artificial intelligence is an incapacity for reliable disambiguation. "[V]irtually every sentence [that people generate] is ambiguous, often in multiple ways." A prominent example is known as the "pronoun disambiguation problem": a machine has no way of determining to whom or what a pronoun in a sentence—such as "he", "she" or "it"—refers.

== Literary translation ==
Translation of literary works (novels, short stories, plays, poems, etc.) is considered a literary pursuit in its own right. Notable in Canadian literature specifically as translators are figures such as Sheila Fischman, Robert Dickson, and Linda Gaboriau; and the Canadian Governor General's Awards annually present prizes for the best English-to-French and French-to-English literary translations.

Other writers, among many who have made a name for themselves as literary translators, include Vasily Zhukovsky, Tadeusz Boy-Żeleński, Vladimir Nabokov, Jorge Luis Borges, Robert Stiller, Lydia Davis, Haruki Murakami, Achy Obejas, and Jhumpa Lahiri.

In the 2010s a substantial gender imbalance was noted in literary translation into English, with far more male writers being translated than women writers. In 2014 Meytal Radzinski launched the Women in Translation campaign to address this.

=== History ===
The first important translation in the West was that of the Septuagint, a collection of Jewish Scriptures translated into early Koine Greek in Alexandria between the 3rd and 1st centuries BCE. The dispersed Jews had forgotten their ancestral language and needed Greek versions (translations) of their Scriptures.

Throughout the Middle Ages, Latin was the lingua franca of the western learned world. The 9th-century Alfred the Great, king of Wessex in England, was far ahead of his time in commissioning vernacular Anglo-Saxon translations of Bede's Ecclesiastical History and Boethius' Consolation of Philosophy. Meanwhile, the Christian Church frowned on even partial adaptations of St. Jerome's Vulgate of c. 384 CE, the standard Latin Bible.

In Asia, the spread of Buddhism led to large-scale ongoing translation efforts spanning well over a thousand years. The Tangut Empire was especially efficient in such efforts; exploiting the then newly invented block printing, and with the full support of the government (contemporary sources describe the Emperor and his mother personally contributing to the translation effort, alongside sages of various nationalities), the Tanguts took mere decades to translate volumes that had taken the Chinese centuries to render.

The Arabs undertook large-scale efforts at translation. Having conquered the Greek world, they made Arabic versions of its philosophical and scientific works. During the Middle Ages, translations of some of these Arabic versions were made into Latin, chiefly at Córdoba in Spain. King Alfonso X the Wise of Castile in the 13th century promoted this effort by founding a Schola Traductorum (School of Translation) in Toledo. There Arabic texts, Hebrew texts, and Latin texts were translated into the other tongues by Muslim, Jewish, and Christian scholars, who also argued the merits of their respective religions. Latin translations of Greek and original Arab works of scholarship and science helped advance European Scholasticism, and thus European science and culture.

The broad historic trends in Western translation practice may be illustrated on the example of translation into the English language.

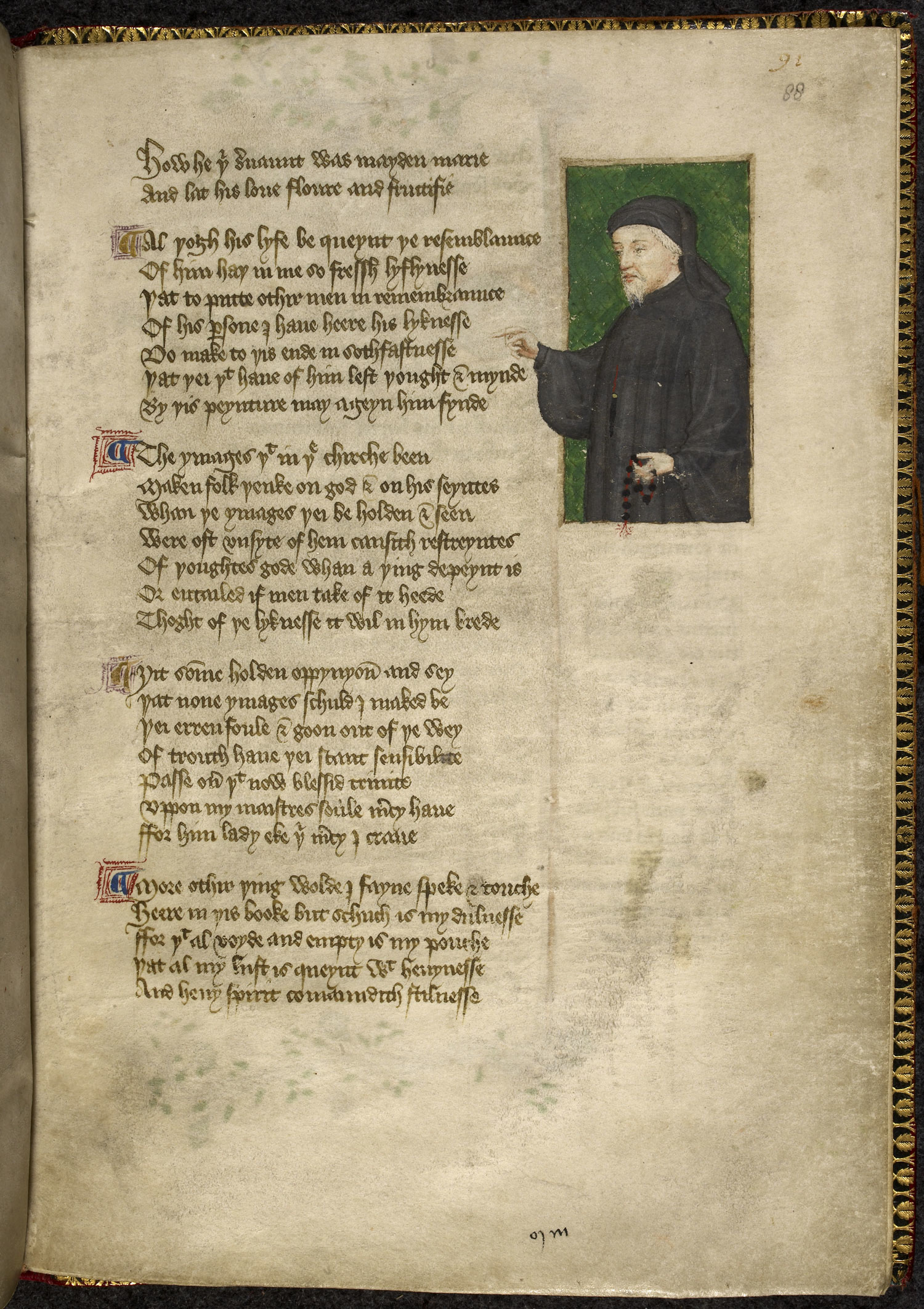
Geoffrey Chaucer

The first fine translations into English were made in the 14th century by Geoffrey Chaucer, who adapted from the Italian of Giovanni Boccaccio in his own Knight's Tale and Troilus and Criseyde, began a translation of the French-language Roman de la Rose, and completed a translation of Boethius from the Latin. Chaucer founded an English poetic tradition on adaptations and translations from those earlier-established literary languages.

The first great English translation was the Wycliffe Bible (c. 1382), which showed the weaknesses of an underdeveloped English prose. Only at the end of the 15th century did the great age of English prose translation begin with Thomas Malory's Le Morte d'Arthur—an adaptation of Arthurian romances so free that it can, in fact, hardly be called a true translation. The first great Tudor translations are, accordingly, the Tyndale New Testament (1525), which influenced the Authorized Version (1611), and Lord Berners' version of Jean Froissart's Chronicles (1523–25).

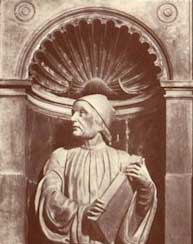
Marsilio Ficino

Meanwhile, in Renaissance Italy, a new period in the history of translation had opened in Florence with the arrival, at the court of Cosimo de' Medici, of the Byzantine scholar Georgius Gemistus Pletho shortly before the fall of Constantinople to the Turks (1453). A Latin translation of Plato's works was undertaken by Marsilio Ficino. This and Erasmus' Latin edition of the New Testament led to a new attitude to translation. For the first time, readers demanded rigor of rendering, as philosophical and religious beliefs depended on the exact words of Plato, Aristotle and Jesus.

Non-scholarly literature, however, continued to rely on adaptation. France's Pléiade, England's Tudor poets, and the Elizabethan translators adapted themes by Horace, Ovid, Petrarch and modern Latin writers, forming a new poetic style on those models. The English poets and translators sought to supply a new public, created by the rise of a middle class and the development of printing, with works such as the original authors would have written, had they been writing in England in that day.

The Elizabethan period of translation saw considerable progress beyond mere paraphrase toward an ideal of stylistic equivalence, but even to the end of this period, which actually reached to the middle of the 17th century, there was no concern for verbal accuracy.

In the second half of the 17th century, the poet John Dryden sought to make Virgil speak "in words such as he would probably have written if he were living and an Englishman". As great as Dryden's poem is, however, one is reading Dryden, and not experiencing the Roman poet's concision. Similarly, Homer arguably suffers from Alexander Pope's endeavor to reduce the Greek poet's "wild paradise" to order. Both works live on as worthy English epics, more than as a point of access to the Latin or Greek.

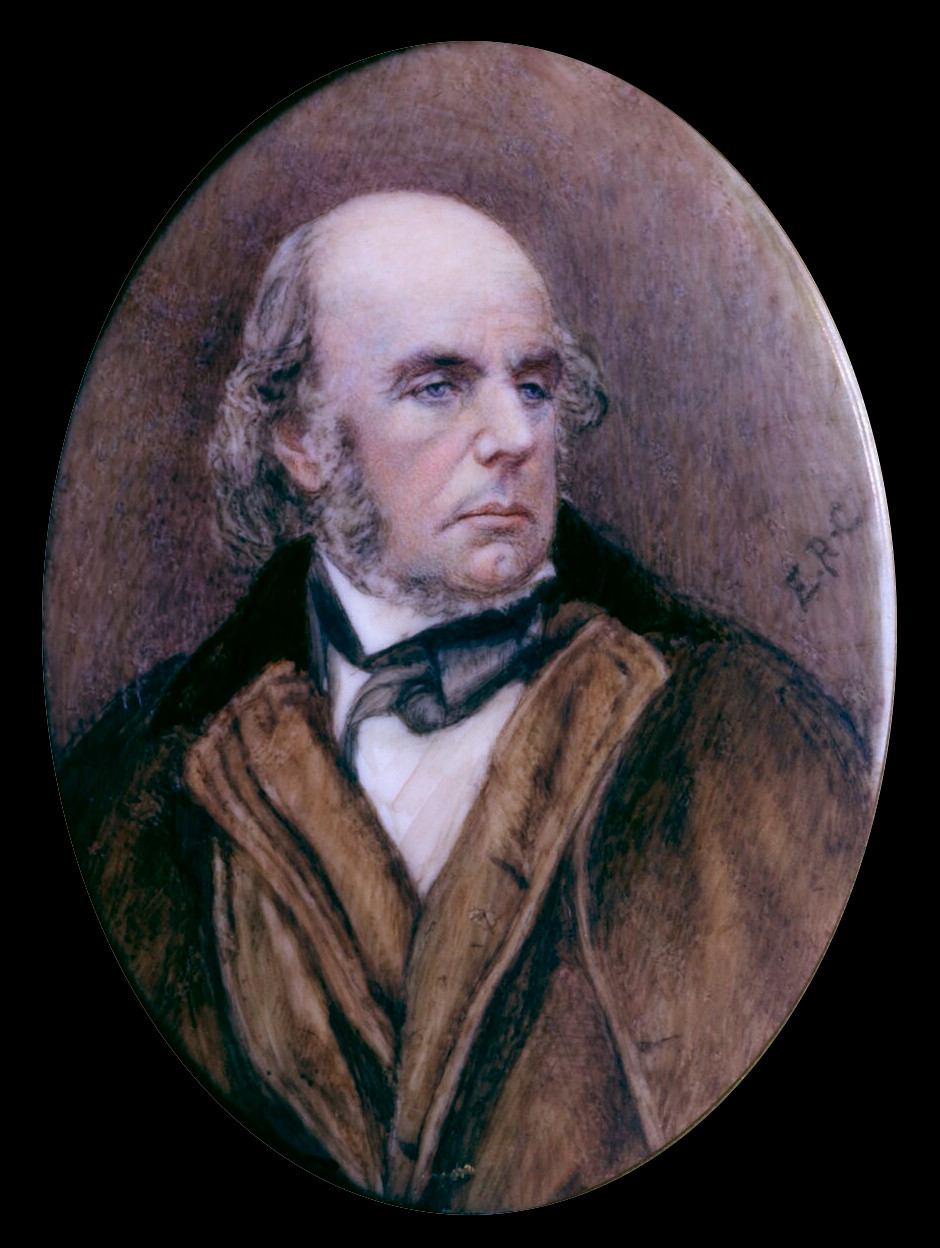
Edward FitzGerald

Throughout the 18th century, the watchword of translators was ease of reading. Whatever they did not understand in a text, or thought might bore readers, they omitted. They cheerfully assumed that their own style of expression was the best, and that texts should be made to conform to it in translation. For scholarship they cared no more than had their predecessors, and they did not shrink from making translations from translations in third languages, or from languages that they hardly knew, or—as in the case of James Macpherson's "translations" of Ossian—from texts that were actually of the "translator's" own composition.

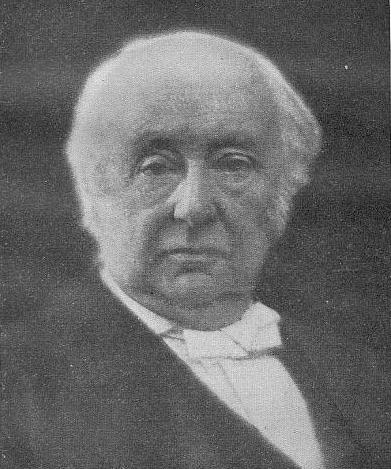
Benjamin Jowett

The 19th century brought new standards of accuracy and style. Regarding accuracy, observes J.M. Cohen, the policy became "the text, the whole text, and nothing but the text", except for any bawdy passages and the addition of copious explanatory footnotes. (Note: For instance, Henry Benedict Mackey's translation of St. Francis de Sales's "Treatise on the Love of God" consistently omits the saint's analogies comparing God to a nursing mother, references to Bible stories such as the rape of Tamar, and so forth.) Regarding style, the Victorians' aim, achieved through far-reaching metaphrase (literality) or pseudo-metaphrase, was to constantly remind readers that they were reading a foreign classic. An exception was the outstanding translation in this period, Edward FitzGerald's Rubaiyat of Omar Khayyam (1859), which achieved its Oriental flavor largely by using Persian names and discreet Biblical echoes and actually drew little of its material from the Persian original.

In advance of the 20th century, a new pattern was set in 1871 by Benjamin Jowett, who translated Plato into simple, straightforward language. Jowett's example was not followed, however, until well into the new century, when accuracy rather than style became the principal criterion.

=== Modern translation ===
As a language evolves, texts in an earlier version of the language—original texts, or old translations—may become difficult for modern readers to understand. Such a text may therefore be translated into a more modern language, producing a "modern translation" (e.g., a "modern English translation" or "modernized translation").

Such modern rendering is applied either to literature from classical languages such as Latin or Greek, notably to the Bible (see "Modern English Bible translations"), or to literature from an earlier stage of the same language, as with the works of William Shakespeare (which are largely understandable by a modern audience, though with some difficulty) or with Geoffrey Chaucer's Middle-English Canterbury Tales (which is understandable to most modern readers only through heavy dependence on footnotes). In 2015 the Oregon Shakespeare Festival commissioned a professional translation of the entire Shakespeare canon, including disputed works such as Edward III, into contemporary vernacular English; in 2019, off-off-Broadway, the canon was premiered in a month-long series of staged readings.

Anna North writes: "Translating the long-dead language Homer used—a variant of ancient Greek called Homeric Greek—into contemporary English is no easy task, and translators bring their own skills, opinions, and stylistic sensibilities to the text. The result is that every translation is different, almost a new poem in itself." An example is Emily Wilson's 2017 translation of Homer's Odyssey, where by conscious choice Wilson "lays bare the morals of its time and place, and invites us to consider how different they are from our own, and how similar."

=== Poetry ===
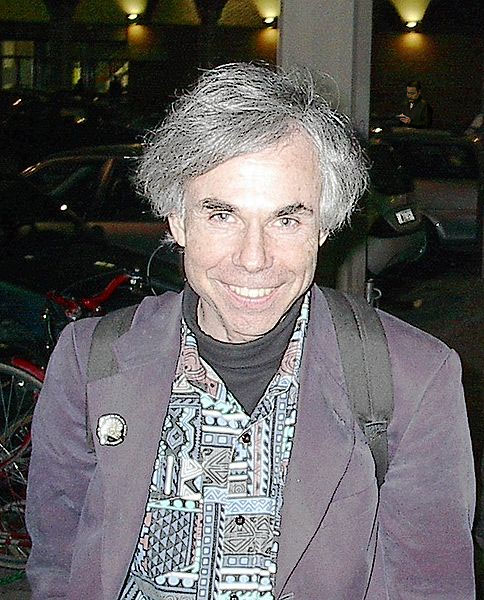
Hofstadter

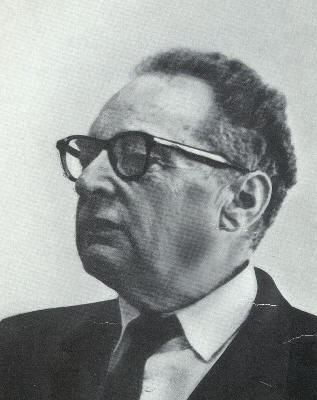
Jakobson

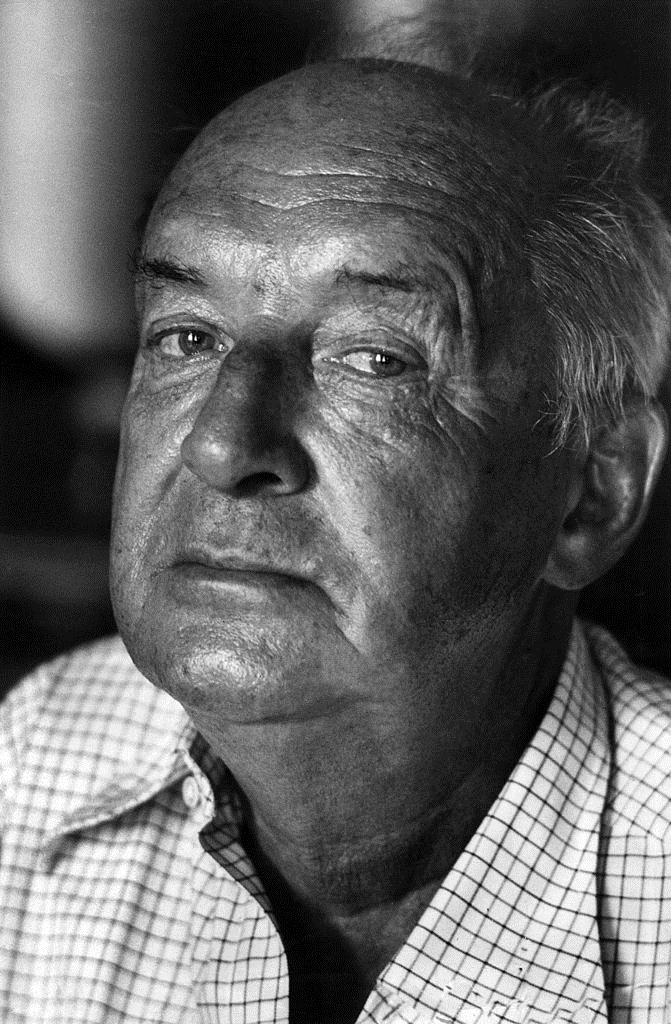
Nabokov

Views on the possibility of satisfactorily translating poetry show a broad spectrum, depending partly on the degree of latitude desired by the translator regarding a poem's formal features (rhythm, rhyme, verse form, etc.), but also relating to how much of the suggestiveness and imagery in the host poem can be recaptured or approximated in the target language. In his 1997 book Le Ton beau de Marot, Douglas Hofstadter argued that a good translation of a poem must convey as much as possible not only of its literal meaning but also of its form and structure (meter, rhyme or alliteration scheme, etc.).

The Russian-born linguist and semiotician Roman Jakobson, however, had in his 1959 paper "On Linguistic Aspects of Translation", declared that "poetry by definition [is] untranslatable". Vladimir Nabokov, another Russian-born author, took a view similar to Jakobson's. He considered rhymed, metrical, versified poetry to be in principle untranslatable and therefore rendered his 1964 English translation of Alexander Pushkin's Eugene Onegin in prose.

Hofstadter, in Le Ton beau de Marot, criticized Nabokov's attitude toward verse translation. In 1999 Hofstadter published his own translation of Eugene Onegin, in verse form.

However, a number of more contemporary literary translators of poetry lean toward Alexander von Humboldt's notion of language as a "third universe" existing "midway between the phenomenal reality of the 'empirical world' and the internalized structures of consciousness." Perhaps this is what poet Sholeh Wolpé, translator of the 12th-century Iranian epic poem The Conference of the Birds, means when she writes:

Twelfth-century Persian and contemporary English are as different as sky and sea. The best I can do as a poet is to reflect one into the other. The sea can reflect the sky with its moving stars, shifting clouds, gestations of the moon, and migrating birds—but ultimately the sea is not the sky. By nature, it is liquid. It ripples. There are waves. If you are a fish living in the sea, you can only understand the sky if its reflection becomes part of the water. Therefore, this translation of The Conference of the Birds, while faithful to the original text, aims at its re-creation into a still living and breathing work of literature.

Poet Sherod Santos writes: "The task is not to reproduce the content, but with the flint and the steel of one's own language to spark what Robert Lowell has called 'the fire and finish of the original.'" According to Walter Benjamin:

While a poet's words endure in his own language, even the greatest translation is destined to become part of the growth of its own language and eventually to perish with its renewal. Translation is so far removed from being the sterile equation of two dead languages that of all literary forms it is the one charged with the special mission of watching over the maturing process of the original language and the birth pangs of its own.

Gregory Hays, in the course of discussing Roman adapted translations of ancient Greek literature, makes approving reference to some views on the translating of poetry expressed by David Bellos, an accomplished French-to-English translator. Hays writes:

Among the idées reçues [received ideas] skewered by David Bellos is the old saw that "poetry is what gets lost in translation." The saying is often attributed to Robert Frost, but as Bellos notes, the attribution is as dubious as the idea itself. A translation is an assemblage of words, and as such it can contain as much or as little poetry as any other such assemblage. The Japanese even have a word (chōyaku, roughly "hypertranslation") to designate a version that deliberately improves on the original.

The translator's task, when translating rhymed verse, is more constraining than is the task of the verse's author: the author has full freedom to coordinate his thought with his words; the translator is constrained to adjust his words to the author's thought.

=== Book titles ===
Book-title translations can be either descriptive or symbolic. Descriptive book titles, for example Antoine de Saint-Exupéry's Le Petit Prince (The Little Prince), are meant to be informative, and can name the protagonist and indicate the theme of the book. An example of a symbolic book title is Stieg Larsson's The Girl with the Dragon Tattoo, whose original Swedish title is Män som hatar kvinnor (Men Who Hate Women). Such symbolic book titles usually indicate the theme, issues, or atmosphere of the work.

When translators are working with long book titles, the translated titles are often shorter and indicate the theme of the book.

=== Plays ===
The translation of plays poses many problems such as the added element of actors, speech duration, translation literalness, and the relationship between the arts of drama and acting. Successful play translators are able to create language that allows the actor and the playwright to work together effectively. Play translators must also take into account several other aspects: the final performance, varying theatrical and acting traditions, characters' speaking styles, modern theatrical discourse, and even the acoustics of the auditorium, i.e., whether certain words will have the same effect on the new audience as they had on the original audience.

Audiences in Shakespeare's time were more accustomed than modern playgoers to actors having longer stage time. Modern translators tend to simplify the sentence structures of earlier dramas, which included compound sentences with intricate hierarchies of subordinate clauses.

=== Chinese literature ===
In translating Chinese literature, translators struggle to find true fidelity in translating into the target language. In The Poem Behind the Poem, Barnstone argues that poetry "can't be made to sing through a mathematics that doesn't factor in the creativity of the translator".

A notable piece of work translated into English is the Wen Xuan, an anthology representative of major works of Chinese literature. Translating this work requires a high knowledge of the genres presented in the book, such as poetic forms, various prose types including memorials, letters, proclamations, praise poems, edicts, and historical, philosophical and political disquisitions, threnodies and laments for the dead, and examination essays. Thus the literary translator must be familiar with the writings, lives, and thought of a large number of its 130 authors, making the Wen Xuan one of the most difficult literary works to translate.

=== Religious texts ===
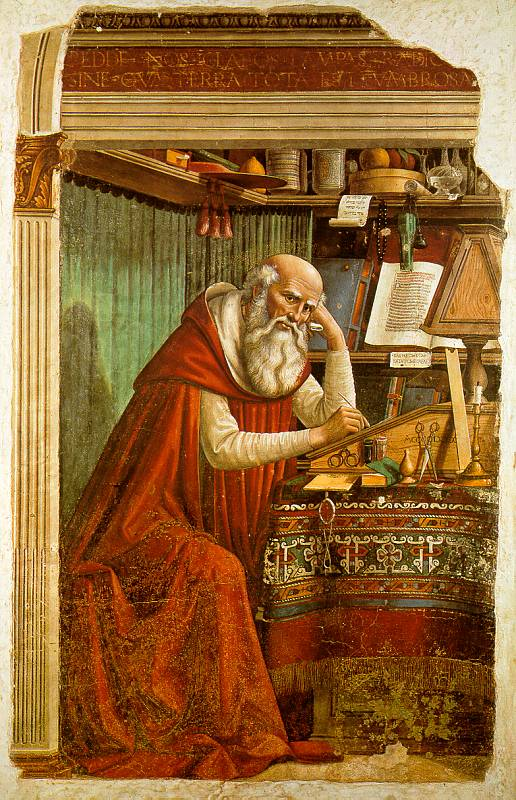
Jerome, patron saint of translators and encyclopedists

An important role in history has been played by the translation of religious texts. Such translations may be influenced by tension between the text and the religious values the translators wish to convey. For example, Buddhist monks who translated the Indian sutras into Chinese occasionally adjusted their translations to better reflect China's distinct culture, emphasizing notions such as filial piety.

One of the first recorded instances of translation in the West was the 3rd century BCE rendering of some books of the biblical Old Testament from Hebrew into Koine Greek. The translation is known as the "Septuagint", a name that refers to the supposedly seventy translators (seventy-two, in some versions) who were commissioned to translate the Bible at Alexandria, Egypt. According to legend, each translator worked in solitary confinement in his own cell, and all seventy versions proved identical. The Septuagint became the source text for later translations into many languages, including Latin, Coptic, Armenian, and Georgian.

Still considered one of the greatest translators in history, for having rendered the Bible into Latin, is Jerome (347–420 CE), the patron saint of translators. For centuries the Roman Catholic Church used his translation (known as the Vulgate), though even this translation stirred controversy. By contrast with Jerome's contemporary, Augustine of Hippo (354–430 CE), who endorsed precise translation, Jerome believed in adaptation, and sometimes invention, in order to more effectively bring across the meaning. Jerome's colorful Vulgate translation of the Bible includes some crucial instances of "overdetermination". For example, Isaiah's prophecy announcing that the Savior will be born of a virgin uses the word 'almah, which is also used to describe the dancing girls at Solomon's court, and simply means young and nubile. Jerome, writes Marina Warner, translates it as virgo, "adding divine authority to the virulent cult of sexual disgust that shaped Christian moral theology (the [Moslem] Quran, free from this linguistic trap, does not connect Mariam/Mary's miraculous nature with moral horror of sex)." The apple that Eve offered to Adam, according to Mark Polizzotti, could equally well have been an apricot, orange, or banana; but Jerome liked the pun malus/malum (apple/evil).

Pope Francis suggested that the phrase "lead us not into temptation", in the Lord's Prayer found in the Gospels of Matthew (the first Gospel, written c. 80–90 CE) and Luke (the third Gospel, written c. 80–110 CE), should more properly be translated, "do not let us fall into temptation", commenting that God does not lead people into temptation—Satan does. (Note: MJC Warren, Lecturer in Biblical and Religious Studies, University of Sheffield, points out (more explicitly than Charles McNamara) that Luke gives a shorter version of Jesus's Lord's Prayer, leaving off the request that God "deliver us from evil"; that (as Charles McNamara also says) accurate translation is not the question here; and that the Bible records a number of incidents when God commands evil actions, such as that Abraham kill his only son, Isaac (whose execution is canceled at the last moment).) Some important early Christian authors interpreted the Bible's Greek text and Jerome's Latin Vulgate similarly to Pope Francis. A.J.B. Higgins in 1943 showed that among the earliest Christian authors, the understanding and even the text of this devotional verse underwent considerable changes. These ancient writers suggest that, even if the Greek and Latin texts are left unmodified, something like "do not let us fall" could be an acceptable English rendering. Higgins cited Tertullian, the earliest of the Latin Church Fathers (c. 155 – c. 240 CE, "do not allow us to be led") and Cyprian (c. 200–258 CE, "do not allow us to be led into temptation"). A later author, Ambrose (c. 340–397 CE), followed Cyprian's interpretation. Augustine of Hippo (354–430), familiar with Jerome's Latin Vulgate rendering, observed that "many people... say it this way: 'and do not allow us to be led into temptation.'"

In 863 CE the brothers Saints Cyril and Methodius, the Byzantine Empire's "Apostles to the Slavs", began translating parts of the Bible into the Old Church Slavonic language, using the Glagolitic script that they had devised, based on the Greek alphabet.

The periods preceding and contemporary with the Protestant Reformation saw translations of the Bible into vernacular (local) European languages—a development that contributed to Western Christianity's split into Roman Catholicism and Protestantism over disparities between Catholic and Protestant renderings of crucial words and passages (and due to a Protestant-perceived need to reform the Roman Catholic Church). Lasting effects on the religions, cultures, and languages of their respective countries were exerted by such Bible translations as Martin Luther's into German (the New Testament, 1522), Jakub Wujek's into Polish (1599, as revised by the Jesuits), and William Tyndale's version (New Testament, 1526 and revisions) and the King James Version into English (1611).

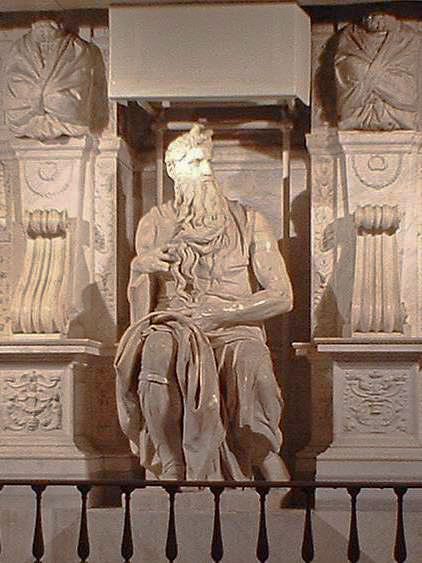
Mistranslation: Michelangelo's horned Moses

Efforts to translate the Bible into English had their martyrs. William Tyndale (c. 1494–1536) was convicted of heresy at Antwerp, was strangled to death while tied to the stake, and then his dead body was burned. Earlier, John Wycliffe (c. mid-1320s – 1384) had managed to die a natural death, but 30 years later the Council of Constance in 1415 declared him a heretic and decreed that his works and earthly remains should be burned; the order, confirmed by Pope Martin V, was carried out in 1428, and Wycliffe's corpse was exhumed and burned and the ashes cast into the River Swift. Debate and religious schism over different translations of religious texts continue, as demonstrated by, for example, the King James Only movement.

A famous mistranslation of a Biblical text is the rendering of the Hebrew word קֶרֶן (keren), which has several meanings, as "horn" in a context where it more plausibly means "beam of light": as a result, for centuries artists, including sculptor Michelangelo, have rendered Moses the Lawgiver with horns growing from his forehead.

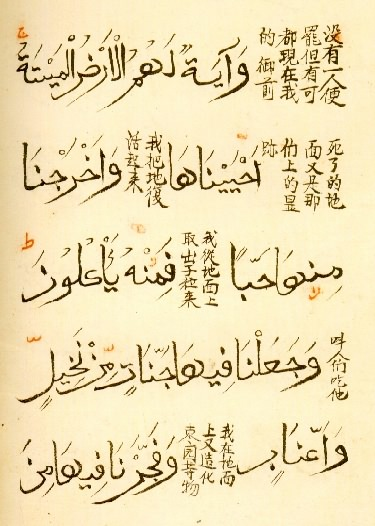
Chinese translation, verses 33–34 of Quran's surah (chapter) 36

Such fallibility of the translation process has contributed to the Islamic world's ambivalence about translating the Quran (also spelled Koran) from the original Arabic, as received by the prophet Muhammad from Allah (God) through the angel Gabriel incrementally between 609 and 632 CE, the year of Muhammad's death. During prayers, the Quran, as the miraculous and inimitable word of Allah, is recited only in Arabic. However, as of 1936, it had been translated into at least 102 languages.

A fundamental difficulty in translating the Quran accurately stems from the fact that an Arabic word, like a Hebrew or Aramaic word, may have a range of meanings, depending on context. This is said to be a linguistic feature, particularly of all Semitic languages, that adds to the usual similar difficulties encountered in translating between any two languages. There is always an element of human judgment—of interpretation—involved in understanding and translating a text. Muslims regard any translation of the Quran as but one possible interpretation of the Quranic (Classical) Arabic text, and not as a full equivalent of that divinely communicated original. Hence such a translation is often called an "interpretation" rather than a translation.

To complicate matters further, as with other languages, the meanings and usages of some expressions have changed over time, between the Classical Arabic of the Quran and modern Arabic. Thus a modern Arabic speaker may misinterpret the meaning of a word or passage in the Quran. Moreover, the interpretation of a Quranic passage will also depend on the historical context of Muhammad's life and of his early community. Properly researching that context requires a detailed knowledge of hadith and sirah, which are themselves vast and complex texts. Hence, analogously to the translating of Chinese literature, an attempt at an accurate translation of the Quran requires a knowledge not only of the Arabic language and of the target language, including their respective evolutions, but also a deep understanding of the two cultures involved.

=== Experimental literature ===
Experimental literature, such as Kathy Acker’s novel Don Quixote (1986) and Giannina Braschi’s novel Yo-Yo Boing! (1998), features a translative writing that highlights discomforts of the interlingual and translingual encounters and literary translation as a creative practice. These authors weave their own translations into their texts.

Acker's postmodern fiction both fragments and preserves the materiality of Catullus’s Latin text in ways that tease out its semantics and syntax without wholly appropriating them, a method that unsettles the notion of any fixed and finished translation.

On the other hand, Braschi's trilogy of experimental works (Empire of Dreams, 1988; Yo-Yo Boing!, 1998, and United States of Banana, 2011) deals with the very subject of translation. Her trilogy presents the evolution of the Spanish language through loose translations of dramatic, poetic, and philosophical writings from the Medieval, Golden Age, and Modernist eras into contemporary Caribbean, Latin American, and Nuyorican Spanish expressions. Braschi's translations of classical texts in Iberian Spanish (into other regional and historical linguistic and poetic frameworks) challenge the concept of national languages.

=== Science fiction ===
Science fiction being a genre with a recognizable set of conventions and literary genealogies, in which language often includes neologisms, neosemes, and invented languages, techno-scientific and pseudoscientific vocabulary, and fictional representation of the translation process, the translation of science-fiction texts involves specific concerns. The science-fiction translator tends to acquire specific competences and assume a distinctive publishing and cultural agency. As in the case of other mass-fiction genres, this professional specialization and role often is not recognized by publishers and scholars.

Translation of science fiction accounts for the transnational nature of science fiction's repertoire of shared conventions and tropes. After World War II, many European countries were swept by a wave of translations from English. Due to the prominence of English as a source language, the use of pseudonyms and pseudotranslations became common in countries such as Italy and Hungary, and English has often been used as a vehicular language to translate from languages such as Chinese and Japanese.

As of 2015, the international market in science-fiction translations has seen an increasing presence of source languages other than English.

== Technical translation ==
Technical translation renders documents whose useful lives are often limited – such as manuals, instruction sheets, internal memos, minutes, and financial reports – for a limited audience who are directly affected by the document. Thus, a user guide for a particular model of refrigerator is useful only for the refrigerator's owner and will remain useful only so long as that refrigerator model is in use. Similarly, software documentation generally pertains to a particular software, whose applications are used only by a certain class of users.

Some translators need to entrust letters, debates, and similar texts in other languages and specialized fields to other translators to enhance the completeness of their work. For example, in the book Tarikh-e Alam-ara-ye Abbasi the translator collaborated with an Ottoman Turkish translator and a specialist in Islamic sciences to translate the work into English. Some translators also need to travel to different countries for accurate translation and identification of geographical names. They sometimes seek assistance from specialists to read and translate certain difficult and illegible historical texts.

== Survey translation ==
A survey questionnaire consists of a list of questions and answer categories aimed at extracting data from a particular group of people about their attitude, behavior, or knowledge. In cross-national and cross-cultural survey research, translation is crucial to collecting comparable data. Originally developed for the European Social Surveys, the model TRAPD (Translation, Review, Adjudication, Pretest, and Documentation) is now "widely used in the global survey research community, although not always labeled as such or implemented in its complete form".

A team approach is recommended in the survey-translation process, to include translators, subject-matter experts, and persons helpful to the process. For example, even when project managers and researchers do not speak the language of the translation, they know the study objectives well and the intent behind the questions, and therefore have a key role in improving the translation. In addition, a survey-translation framework based on sociolinguistics states that a linguistically appropriate translation cannot be wholly sufficient to achieve the communicative effect of the source-language survey; the translation must also incorporate the social practices and cultural norms of the target language.

== See also ==
- American Literary Translators Association
- Back-translation
- Bible translations
- Bible translations into English
- Bilingual dictionary
- Bilingual pun
- Bilingualism
- Brevity law
- Bridge language
- Calque
- CEATL
- Certified translation
- Chinese translation theory
- Code mixing
- Communication accommodation theory
- Contrastive linguistics
- Critical period hypothesis
- Dictionary-based machine translation
- Diglossia
- Dummy pronoun
- Equivalence (translation)
- European Master's in Translation
- Example-based machine translation
- False cognate
- False friend
- First language
- Formulaic language
- Fusional languages
- Graeco-Arabic translation movement
- Head (linguistics)
- History of scholarship
- Homophonic translation
- Humour in translation
- Hybrid word
- Idiom
- Indeterminacy of translation
- Indirect translation
- Inflected languages
- International Federation of Translators
- Internationalization and localization
- Interpreting notes
- Legal translation
- Lexicography
- Literal translation
- Machine translation
- Medical translation
- Menzerath's law
- Metaphrase
- Mobile translation
- Multilingualism
- National Translation Mission (NTM)
- Neural machine translation
- Ontological commitment
- Paralanguage
- Pseudotranslation
- Register (sociolinguistics)
- Rule-based machine translation
- Second language
- Second-language acquisition
- Self-translation
- Semantic equivalence (linguistics)
- Skopos theory
- Sound symbolism
- Statistical machine translation
- Syntax
- Synthetic languages
- Technical translation
- Terminology
- Textual criticism
- Transcription (linguistics)
- Translating for legal equivalence
- Translation associations
- Translation criticism
- Translation memory
- Translation-quality standards
- Translation studies

== Bibliography ==
- Armstrong, Rebecca, "All Kinds of Unlucky" (review of The Aeneid, translated by Shadi Bartsch, Profile, November 2020, ISBN 978 1 78816 267 8, 400 pp.), London Review of Books, vol. 43, no. 5 (4 March 2021), pp. 35–36.
- Baker, Mona; Saldanha, Gabriela (2008). Routledge Encyclopedia of Translation Studies. New York: Routledge. ISBN 9780415369305.
- Balcerzan, Edward, ed. (1977). Pisarze polscy o sztuce przekładu, 1440–1974: Antologia [Polish Writers on the Art of Translation, 1440–1974: an Anthology] (in Polish). Poznań: Wydawnictwo Poznańskie. OCLC 4365103.
- Bassnett, Susan (1990). Translation studies. London & New York: Routledge. ISBN 9780415065283.
- Berman, Antoine (1984). L'épreuve de l'étranger: culture et traduction dans l'Allemagne romantique: Herder, Goethe, Schlegel, Novalis, Humboldt, Schleiermacher, Hölderlin (in French). Paris: Gallimard, Essais. ISBN 9782070700769. Excerpted in English in Venuti, Lawrence (2004) [2002]. The translation studies reader (2nd ed.). New York: Routledge. ISBN 9780415319201.
- Berman, Antoine (1995). Pour une critique des traductions: John Donne (in French). Paris: Gallimard. ISBN 9782070733354. English translation: Berman, Antoine (2009). Toward a translation criticism: John Donne. Translated by Massardier-Kenney, Françoise. Ohio: Kent State University Press. ISBN 9781606350096.
- Billiani, Francesca (2001), "Ethics", in Baker, Mona (ed.), Routledge Encyclopedia of Translation Studies, New York: Routledge, ISBN 9780415255172.
- Bromwich, David, "In Praise of Ambiguity" (a review of Michael Wood, On Empson, Princeton University Press, 2017), The New York Review of Books), vol. LXIV, no. 16 (26 October 2017), pp. 50–52.
- Cohen, J.M., "Translation", Encyclopedia Americana, 1986, vol. 27, p. 14.
- Darwish, Ali (1999), Towards a theory of constraints in translation, doi:10.13140/RG.2.1.1104.3927 Work in progress version (pdf).
- Davis, Lydia, "Eleven Pleasures of Translating", The New York Review of Books, vol. LXIII, no. 19 (8 December 2016), pp. 22–24. "I like to reproduce the word order, and the order of ideas, of the original [text] whenever possible. [p. 22] [T]ranslation is, eternally, a compromise. You settle for the best you can do rather than achieving perfection, though there is the occasional perfect solution [to the problem of finding an equivalent expression in the target language]." (p. 23.)
- Dryden, John. "Preface to Sylvae". Bartelby.com.
- Fatani, Afnan, "Translation and the Qur'an", in Oliver Leaman, The Qur'an: An Encyclopaedia, Routledge, 2006, pp. 657–69.
- Galassi, Jonathan (June 2000). "FEATURE: Como conversazione: on translation". The Paris Review. 42 (155): 255–312. Poets and critics Seamus Heaney, Charles Tomlinson, Tim Parks, and others discuss the theory and practice of translation.
- Gleick, James, "The Fate of Free Will" (review of Kevin J. Mitchell, Free Agents: How Evolution Gave Us Free Will, Princeton University Press, 2023, 333 pp.), The New York Review of Books, vol. LXXI, no. 1 (18 January 2024), pp. 27–28, 30.
- Godayol, Pilar (February 2013). "Metaphors, women and translation: from les belles infidèles to la frontera". Gender and Language. 7 (1): 97–116. doi:10.1558/genl.v7i1.97.
- Gorra, Michael, "Corrections of Taste" (review of Terry Eagleton, Critical Revolutionaries: Five Critics Who Changed the Way We Read, Yale University Press, 323 pp.), The New York Review of Books, vol. LXIX, no. 15 (6 October 2022), pp. 16–18.
- Gouadec, Daniel (2007). Translation as a profession. Amsterdam: John Benjamins. ISBN 9789027216816.
- Greenblatt, Stephen, "Can We Ever Master King Lear?", The New York Review of Books, vol. LXIV, no. 3 (23 February 2017), pp. 34–36.
- Hays, Gregory, "Found in Translation" (review of Denis Feeney, Beyond Greek: The Beginnings of Latin Literature, Harvard University Press), The New York Review of Books, vol. LXIV, no. 11 (22 June 2017), pp. 56, 58.
- Kaiser, Walter, "A Hero of Translation" (a review of Jean Findlay, Chasing Lost Time: The Life of C.K. Scott Moncrieff: Soldier, Spy, and Translator, Farrar, Straus and Giroux, 351 pp., $30.00), The New York Review of Books, vol. LXII, no. 10 (4 June 2015), pp. 54–56.
- Lauren Kane, "Translating from Troy to Ithaca", an interview, in the 10 May 2025 New York Review of Books email newsletter, with Daniel Mendelsohn about his English rendition of Homer's Odyssey published in April 2025.
- Kasparek, Christopher (1983). "The translator's endless toil (book reviews)". The Polish Review. XXVIII (2): 83–87. JSTOR 25777966. Includes a discussion of European-language cognates of the term, "translation".
- Kasparek, Christopher, translator's foreword to Bolesław Prus, Pharaoh, translated from the Polish, with foreword and notes, by Christopher Kasparek, Amazon Kindle e-book, 2020, ASIN:BO8MDN6CZV.
- Kelly, Louis (1979). The true interpreter: A history of translation theory and practice in the West. New York: St. Martin's Press. ISBN 9780631196402.
- Link, Perry, "A Magician of Chinese Poetry" (review of Eliot Weinberger, with an afterword by Octavio Paz, 19 Ways of Looking at Wang Wei (with More Ways), New Directions, 88 pp., $10.95 [paper]; and Eliot Weinberger, The Ghosts of Birds, New Directions, 211 pp., $16.95 [paper]), The New York Review of Books, vol. LXIII, no. 18 (24 November 2016), pp. 49–50.
- Marcus, Gary, "Am I Human?: Researchers need new ways to distinguish artificial intelligence from the natural kind", Scientific American, vol. 316, no. 3 (March 2017), pp. 58–63. Multiple tests of artificial-intelligence efficacy are needed because, "just as there is no single test of athletic prowess, there cannot be one ultimate test of intelligence." One such test, a "Construction Challenge", would test perception and physical action—"two important elements of intelligent behavior that were entirely absent from the original Turing test." Another proposal has been to give machines the same standardized tests of science and other disciplines that schoolchildren take. A so far insuperable stumbling block to artificial intelligence is an incapacity for reliable disambiguation. "[V]irtually every sentence [that people generate] is ambiguous, often in multiple ways." A prominent example is known as the "pronoun disambiguation problem": a machine has no way of determining to whom or what a pronoun in a sentence—such as "he", "she" or "it"—refers.
- McNamara, Charles, "Lead Us Not into Temptation? Francis Is Not the First to Question a Key Phrase of the Lord's Prayer", Commonweal, 1 January 2018. Lead Us Not into Temptation? | Commonweal Magazine
- Miłosz, Czesław (1983). The history of Polish literature (2nd ed.). Berkeley: University of California Press. ISBN 9780520044777.
- Mlinko, Ange, "Whole Earth Troubador" (review of The Essential W.S. Merwin, edited by Michael Wiegers, Copper Canyon, 338 pp., 2017), The New York Review of Books, vol. LXIV, no. 19 (7 December 2017), pp. 45–46.
- Muhlstein, Anka, "Painters and Writers: When Something New Happens", The New York Review of Books, vol. LXIV, no. 1 (19 January 2017), pp. 33–35.
- Munday, Jeremy (2016). Introducing Translation Studies: theories and applications (4th ed.). London/New York: Routledge. ISBN 978-1138912557.
- Najder, Zdzisław (2007). Joseph Conrad: A Life. Camden House. ISBN 978-1-57113-347-2.
- North, Anna (20 November 2017). "Historically, men translated the Odyssey. Here's what happened when a woman took the job". Vox.
- Parks, Tim (2007). Translating style: a literary approach to translation - a translation approach to literature. New York: Routledge. ISBN 9781905763047.
- Pei, Mario (1984). The story of language. New York: New American Library. ISBN 9780452008700. Introduction by Stuart Berg Flexner, revised edition.
- Piron, Claude (1994). Le défi des langues: du gâchis au bon sens [The language challenge: from chaos to common sense] (in French). Paris: L'Harmattan. ISBN 9782738424327.
- Polizzotti, Mark, Sympathy for the Traitor: A Translation Manifesto, MIT, 168 pp., 2018, ISBN 978 0 262 03799 0.
- Rose, Marilyn Gaddis (January 1980). Translation: agent of communication: an international review of arts and ideas (volume 5, issue 1, special issue). Hamilton, New Zealand: Outrigger Publishers. OCLC 224073589.
- Ruthven, Malise, Islam in the World, Granta, 2006, ISBN 978-1-86207-906-9.
- Ruthven, Malise, "The Islamic Road to the Modern World" (review of Christopher de Bellaigue, The Islamic Enlightenment: The Struggle between Faith and Reason, 1798 to Modern Times, Liveright; and Wael Abu-'Uksa, Freedom in the Arab World: Concepts and Ideologies in Arabic Thought in the Nineteenth Century, Cambridge University Press), The New York Review of Books, vol. LXIV, no. 11 (22 June 2017), pp. 22, 24–25.
- Schleiermacher, Friedrich (2004) [2002], "On the different methods of translating (Über die verschiedenen Methoden des Übersetzens 1813)", in Venuti, Lawrence (ed.), The translation studies reader, translated by Bernofsky, Susan (2nd ed.), New York: Routledge, pp. 43–63, ISBN 9780415319201.
- Simms, Norman T. (1983). Nimrod's sin: treason and translation in a multilingual world (volume 8, issue 2). Hamilton, New Zealand: Outrigger Publishers. OCLC 9719326.
- Snell-Hornby, Mary; Schopp, Jürgen F. (2013). "Translation", European History Online, Mainz, Institute of European History, retrieved 29 August 2013.
- Tatarkiewicz, Władysław (1980). A history of six ideas: an essay in aesthetics. Translated by Kasparek, Christopher. The Hague, Boston, London: Martinus Nijhoff. ISBN 978-8301008246.
- Tatarkiewicz, Władysław, O doskonałości (On Perfection), Warsaw, Państwowe Wydawnictwo Naukowe, 1976; English translation by Christopher Kasparek subsequently serialized in Dialectics and Humanism: The Polish Philosophical Quarterly, vol. VI, no. 4 (autumn 1979)—vol. VIII, no 2 (spring 1981), and reprinted in Władysław Tatarkiewicz, On Perfection, Warsaw University Press, Center of Universalism, 1992, pp. 9–51 (the book is a collection of papers by and about Professor Tatarkiewicz).
- Taylor, Paul, "Insanely Complicated, Hopelessly Inadequate" (review of Brian Cantwell Smith, The Promise of Artificial Intelligence: Reckoning and Judgment, MIT, October 2019, ISBN 978 0 262 04304 5, 157 pp.; Gary Marcus and Ernest Davis, Rebooting AI: Building Artificial Intelligence We Can Trust, Ballantine, September 2019, ISBN 978 1 5247 4825 8, 304 pp.; Judea Pearl and Dana Mackenzie, The Book of Why: The New Science of Cause and Effect, Penguin, May 2019, ISBN 978 0 14 198241 0, 418 pp.), London Review of Books, vol. 43, no. 2 (21 January 2021), pp. 37–39.
- Tobler, Stefan; Sabău, Antoaneta (1 April 2018). "Translating Confession: Editorial RES 1/2018". Review of Ecumenical Studies. 10 (1). Walter de Gruyter GmbH: 5–9. doi:10.2478/ress-2018-0001. ISSN 2359-8107. S2CID 188019915.
- Vélez, Fabio (2016). Antes de Babel. Una historia retórica de la traducción. Granada, Spain: Comares. ISBN 978-8490454718.
- Venuti, Lawrence (1994). The translator's invisibility. New York: Routledge. ISBN 9780415115384.
- Warner, Marina, "The Politics of Translation" (a review of Kate Briggs, This Little Art, 2017; Mireille Gansel, Translation as Transhumance, translated by Ros Schwartz, 2017; Mark Polizzotti, Sympathy for the Traitor: A Translation Manifesto, 2018; Boyd Tonkin, ed., The 100 Best Novels in Translation, 2018; Clive Scott, The Work of Literary Translation, 2018), London Review of Books, vol. 40, no. 19 (11 October 2018), pp. 21–24.
- Wilson, Emily, "A Doggish Translation" (review of The Poems of Hesiod: Theogony, Works and Days, and The Shield of Herakles, translated from the Greek by Barry B. Powell, University of California Press, 2017, 184 pp.), The New York Review of Books, vol. LXV, no. 1 (18 January 2018), pp. 34–36.
- Wilson, Emily, "Ah, how miserable!" (review of three separate translations of The Oresteia by Aeschylus: by Oliver Taplin, Liveright, November 2018; by Jeffrey Scott Bernstein, Carcanet, April 2020; and by David Mulroy, Wisconsin, April 2018), London Review of Books, vol. 42, no. 19 (8 October 2020), pp. 9–12, 14.
- Wilson, Emily, "The Pleasures of Translation" (review of Mark Polizzotti, Sympathy for the Traitor: A Translation Manifesto, MIT Press, 2018, 182 pp.), The New York Review of Books, vol. LXV, no. 9 (24 May 2018), pp. 46–47.
- Michael Wood, "Break your bleedin' heart" (review of Marcel Proust, Swann's Way, translated by James Grieve, NYRB, June 2023, ISBN 978 1 68137 6295, 450 pp.; and Marcel Proust, The Swann Way, translated by Brian Nelson, Oxford, September 2023, ISBN 978 0 19 8871521, 430 pp.), London Review of Books, vol. 46, no. 1 (4 January 2024), pp. 37–38.
- Zethsen, Karen Korning; Askehave, Inger (February 2013). "Talking translation: Is gender an issue?". Gender and Language. 7 (1): 117–134. doi:10.1558/genl.v7i1.117.
