= Skopos theory =

Theory in translation studies

Skopos theory (German: Skopostheorie) is an approach in the field of translation studies that gives primary importance to the purpose which a translation is meant to fulfill. This purpose then determines a translation strategy.

The theory originates with the linguist Hans Vermeer, who uses the Greek word skopos (“purpose,” “intention,” or “aim”) as a technical term.

The framework of the theory assumes the existence of a client, a translator, and a specific audience. The client formulates the skopos of a given text, with the audience in mind. The translator uses the client’s brief, and the rules and directives of the theory, to produce a target-language text. Thus the translation is determined by the skopos, more than by the original text.

Within translation studies, skopos theory can be seen as part of a trend away from equivalence toward functionalism.

== Overview ==
=== Background ===
The theory first appeared in an article published by Vermeer in the German Journal Lebende Sprachen, 1978.

As a realisation of James Holmes’ map of Translation Studies (1972), skopos theory is the core of the four approaches of German functionalist translation theory that emerged around the late twentieth century. They were part of the development of skopos theory contributed by scholars of translation studies, categorised into four stages:

1. Katharina Reiss's Functional Category, 1971
2. Hans Vermeer’s Skopos theory, 1978
3. Justa-Holz Manttari's Theory of Translatorial Action, 1981
4. Christiane Nord's Theory of ‘Function plus Loyalty’, 1997

=== Definition ===
Skopos (Greek: σκοπός) is a Greek word defined as "purpose". It is a technical term, coined by Hans Vermeer, that represents the aim of a translation. Paul Kussmaul illustrates skopos theory as "the functional approach has a great affinity with skopos theory. The function of a translation depends on the knowledge, expectations, values and norms of the target readers, who are again influenced by the situation they are in and by the culture. These factors determine whether the function of the source text or passages in the source text can be preserved or have to be modified or even changed."

According to Vermeer, there are three possible types of purposes. First, a general purpose that a translator strives for, such as translating as a source of professional income. Second, a communicative purpose of a target text in a target circumstance, such as to instruct the audience. Third, the purpose of a translation strategy or approach, such as to exhibit the structural traits of the source language. The term ‘skopos’ in skopos theory refers to the second type of purpose. The theory treats the source text as an "offer of information in a target culture" and this view is seen as a consequence of constructivist comprehension theories.

A clearer execution of the translational action—translation as a human action that thus possesses intention—can be achieved through the identification of its purpose. Consequently, this generates a translatum—the target text (outcome) of a source text.

=== Motivations ===
Skopos theory was implemented by Vermeer to bridge the gap between practice and theory that existed in the previously widespread and commonplace Equivalence Theory. In this attempt, Vermeer sought another method of translation that would go beyond looking only at the linguistics level and consequently move translation forward from “the eternal dilemmas of free vs. faithful translation, dynamic vs. formal equivalence, good interpreters vs. slavish translators, and so on”, which are problems existing in past translation theories. Vermeer stated that:

Linguistics alone won’t help us; first, because translating is not merely and not even primarily a linguistic process. Secondly, because linguistics has not yet formulated the right questions to tackle our problems. So let’s look somewhere else.

Under this perspective, he determined that the purely linguistic approaches to translation then were flawed and the translation issues at hand would be problematic to solve. Thus, the general skopos theory was established as the foundation of functional theories, with reference to the existing action theory. Vermeer saw translation as an action like any other and as such, had to possess purpose (skopos) under the action theory. In relation to this, Vermeer saw the act of translation as the production of text in specific target settings for specific purposes and people under specific circumstances.

=== Goal and audience ===
Skopos theory is a general framework for translators that signals “a move away from the static linguistic typologies of translation shifts”. Unlike past translation theories that focus on linguistics and equivalence based translations at a micro level, the translatum in skopos theory does not require functional equivalence to the source text, as the goal of skopos theory places emphasis on the purpose of the translational action instead.

== Theoretical framework ==
=== Action theory ===
According to Vermeer, the Action Theory underpins Skopos Theory in that every action is steered by a purpose. An action is defined as “the action of acting, which means intentionally (at will) bringing about or preventing a change in the world (in nature)”. Since translating is a form of translational action that involves intentional communication (or interaction, if it affects two or more agents) and transition, there must be a purpose associated with it. Vermeer provided several axioms or theses in order to contextualize Skopos Theory as a form of action theory and these include the claim that the Skopos of acting determines the strategy for obtaining the intended goal. Other scholars suggest that, in the translation of materials, contextual factors have to be considered in the process such as the culture of the reader as well as the client who initiated the translation. Action theory, however, has a broader scope than Skopos Theory.

=== Translation brief ===
In order for the translator to interpret the purpose of the translation and employ strategies to act in accordance to the purpose, a translation brief provided by the client is deemed necessary. It states the instruction to execute an assigned action, that is “to translate”.

A commission should comprise as much detailed information as possible on the following (1) the goal, i.e. a specification of the aim of the commission; (2) the conditions under which the intended goal should be attained (naturally including practical matters such as deadline and fee).

The client will provide “as many details as possible about the purpose, explaining the addressees, time, place, occasion and medium of the intended communication and the function the text is intended to have”. By stating the information through written or spoken form, the translation brief is made explicit. However, when the client does not explicitly provide the detailed translation commission, probably due to the unfamiliarity with intercultural communication, the translator ought to negotiate and provide directions on whether the source text has to be translated and the type of target text needed to achieve the purpose, which is the skopos.

An example of a Translation Brief:
Translation Brief:

Please translate the following passage into your LOTE. The client is the University of NSW; the translations are to be published on the UNSW website as information for prospective international students and their parents.

UNSW at a glance

The University of New South Wales is one of Australia’s leading research and teaching universities. Established in 1949, it is ranked among the top 60 universities in the world, renowned for the quality of its graduates and its world class research.

From this translation brief, it can be observed that the client, the University of New South Wales, requires the target language of the information to be in Indonesian. The information will be displayed on a medium that is on UNSW’s website, for the target readers who are Indonesians. The purpose of the translation is to provide information for prospective international students and their parents. Thus, with the explicit purpose identified, the translator will be able to follow it closely and choose the appropriate translation strategy to execute the commission.

=== Culture ===
Vermeer views norms and conventions as the principal features of a culture and sees translation as comparing cultures. In this “comparison”, source-culture knowledge is interpreted using the translator’s existing culture-specific knowledge of the source culture, and whether this “comparison” takes an insider or outsider perspective hinges on whether the translator is translating into or from their own language and culture. Treating cultures and languages as systems and lower level items as elements, when one element is transferred from one system to another, its value will change because it is now related to the elements belonging to the new system. This means that modifications when transferring from source text to target text are appropriate in certain contexts so long the transferred element possesses the same amount of conventionality in the target culture as the original did in the source culture. In addition, the skopos of the translation is determined by a translation brief or translation commission, otherwise referred to as an “intercultural operative”. Thus, it can be seen that although Skopos Theory is more target-oriented, the cultural aspects of the source and target languages play important roles.

== Historical development ==
=== Vermeer's general skopos theory ===
During the time period in which Vermeer's general Skopos theory was founded, the field of Translation Studies was facing a shift from predominantly more formal and ‘linguistic’ theories, where ‘faithfulness’ and ‘equivalence’ to source text was the greatest criterion with the most authority in determining a translation’s success, to theories holding greater regard for functionality and sociocultural factors. This shift had been motivated by the Communication Theory, Action Theory, Text Linguistics and Text Theory, and the orientation towards Reception Theory in Literary Studies. Thus, Skopos Theory can be considered as an offspring of these said theories. Consequently, Skopos Theory formed in that period, and under the influence of the aforementioned theories, had a functionally and socioculturally oriented framework due to its focus on translation factors that lie between extra-linguistic and textual. Many of the factors it adopted from the Action Theory became essential in the late twentieth century due to the growing demand for non-literary text translations. In such texts, contextual factors surrounding them became essential in their translation particularly, when in relation to the function of the text in that specific culture for the specific reader(s).

=== Vermeer and Reiss ===
Apart from the above elaborated general Skopos Theory, Skopos Theory (as a concept) was later further developed by various academics in the field of translation, distinguishing its development into four stages two of which were combined in a later collaboration of which the beginnings of the modern Skopos Theory could be said to have originated from. Specifically, the combination of the general Skopos Theory and Katharina Reiß’s Functional Category model was introduced in their collaborative articles in 1984 and 1991. This combined approach allowed for the extraction of general factors (that affect the translation process) from occurrences found uniquely in individual cultures and/or languages. These aforementioned factors can be consistently linked to and/or from special theories, developing to be more functional and target-oriented.

Under this framework, knowledge of the rationale behind a translation and the function of a target text are paramount for the translator to produce successful translations. Essentially, Skopos Theory rejects equivalence-based translation theories based on their focus on the source text, the purposes of the source text’s author or the effects of a source text on its readers as conclusive determinants in translations. Instead, the Skopos Theory suggests that translations should focus on the target culture and language illustrating the source text, their effects on the reader, and the original author’s purpose as decisive factors, rather than the effects and purposes of the source language.

== Directives and rules ==
=== Directives ===
From Reiß’s and Vermeer’s development of the Skopos Theory, six directives emerged, based on the three main rules governing Skopos Theory. The six underlying directives are:

1. A translatum is determined by its Skopos.

2. A translatum is an offer of information in a target culture and language concerning an offer of information in a source culture and source language.

3. A translatum does not initiate an offer of information in a clearly reversible way.

4. A translatum must be internally coherent.

5. A translatum must be coherent with the source text.

6. The five rules above stand in hierarchical order, with the Skopos rule predominating.

The first and principal directive states that the target text will invariably fall back on the function of the translational action in any commission. The second directive highlights the importance between the relationship of the source text and target text to their functions in their respective linguistic and cultural contexts. Consequently, the translator is the key figure in this intercultural communication for the purposes of producing the translatum. The third directive mentions that a translatum’s function in its target culture may not necessarily be the same as in its source culture, emphasising on its element of irreversibility. The fourth and fifth directives reiterate the general Skopos “rules” concerning the manner of judging success of the action and information transfer. The former falls under the Coherence rule which is linked to internal textual coherence, and the latter, the fidelity rule which is linked to intertextual coherence with the source text.

=== Rules ===
The three main rules of the Skopos Theory that encompass the six underlying directives are:

1. The Skopos rule

2. The Coherence rule

3. The Fidelity rule

The third rule, the Fidelity rule, is subordinate to the second rule, the Coherence rule, which in turn is subordinate to the Skopos rule.

==== The Skopos rule ====
The first rule to obey in the process of translation is the purpose of an overall translational action, which can also be interpreted as “the end justifies the means”. As defined by Vermeer and translated by Nord, the Skopos rule states:

Each text is produced for a given purpose and should serve this purpose. The Skopos rule thus reads as follows: translate/interpret/speak/write in a way that enables your text/translation to function in the situation it is used and with the people who want to use it and precisely in the way they want it to function.

It presupposes other socio-cultural conventions and the orientation towards the source text as observed in previous translation theories. Instead, the Skopos Theory places emphasis on a top-down approach that underscores the target text.

==== The Coherence rule ====
The second rule, the Coherence rule, imposes unto translators the requirement that any target text should make sense according to the target culture of the target language so that the receivers can make sense of it. As quoted from Nord, this rule states:

A translation should be acceptable in a sense that it is coherent with the receivers’ situation.

Nord went on to elaborate that:

A communicative interaction can only be regarded as successful if the receivers interpret it as being sufficiently coherent with their situation.

In other words, under this rule, the receivers of the target text, as well as their cultural background and social circumstances, should all be taken into consideration as major factors to produce meaningful translations. This would allow the meaning in the content of the text to be conveyed in an accurate manner to the said receivers. Thus, under this interpretation, intratextual coherence would specify that a translation is only considered adequate if the receivers can understand the text and interpret it to be coherent with the communicative situation and culture.

==== The Fidelity rule ====
The third ‘overarching’ rule necessitates intertextual coherence between the source and target texts as target texts are produced in accordance to the information offered by source texts. In accordance to this, the form of the target text would be determined by both the translator’s interpretation of the source text and the translation’s purpose. As quoted from Dan, this third rule states:

The TT [target text] should bear some kind of relationship with the corresponding ST [source text].

While this rule is highly similar to the ‘faithfulness’ aspect in previous equivalence translation theories, one significant difference distinguishes them from each other. The Fidelity rule differs from ‘faithfulness’ as the latter is static and unchanging compared to the dynamic nature of the former, where form and degree of the translation changes depending on the translator’s interpretation of the source text. Thus, while the Fidelity rule only requires either maximal faithful imitations or minimal to no relevance to the source (or anything within this range), ‘faithfulness’ necessitates the maximum equivalence possible.

== Application ==
=== Legal translation ===
Legal translation is the translation of legal and interlingual information. This includes the translation of civil and criminal justice systems documents such as contracts, licenses, trademarks and copyrights, litigation agreements, regulations, etc. Under Skopos Theory, the translation of a text is executed in a way that can be used for the purpose and audience that it is intended for, and three rules of Skopos Theory have been argued to assist translators in legal translations. The Fidelity rule revolves around the maintenance of coherence from the source text to the target text. This is applicable to legal translations as legal texts are required to be precise in the definition of terms and the demarcation of its limits. There is a need to be explicit in expressions and the transfer of information to avoid misunderstandings on crucial matters such as contracts, which can in turn prevent unnecessary lawsuits.

Another common issue observed in legal translation is the possibility of lexical gaps in terminology and the lack of corresponding phrasing or concepts between the source and target language and culture. Legal translation is culture-dependent and there may be specific conventions or concepts that are culture-bound and only exist in the source culture and not the target culture, hence Skopos Theory helps to set a standard for translators for the preservation of elements in their transfer from source to target text. Via the Skopos rule and the Coherence rule, the requirement that the target text is coherent for the target text receivers will help to inform translators on adjusting the degree of preservation they want such that this coherence is preserved.

Researching on the applications of Skopos Theory on Chinese law, scholar Liu Yanping demonstrates strategies such as shifting, omission, cutting, addition, combination and conversion, with an example of omission as follows:

Original legislation:

第六十八条
犯罪分子有揭发他人犯罪行为,查证属实的,或者提供重要线索,从而得以侦破其他案件等立功表现的, 可以从轻或者减轻处罚;有重大立功表现的,可以减轻或者免除处罚。犯罪后自首又有重大立功表现的,应当减轻或者免除处罚。

English translation:

Article 68
Any criminal who performs such meritorious services as exposing an offence committed by another, which is verified through investigation, or producing important clues for solving other cases may be given a lighter or mitigated punishment. Any criminal who performs major meritorious services may be given a mitigated punishment or be exempted from punishment.

Original legislation:

第七十二条
对于被判处拘役、三年以下有期徒刑的犯罪分子,根据犯罪分子的犯罪情节和悔罪表现, 适用缓刑确实不致再危害社会的,可以宣告缓刑。

English translation:

Article 72
A suspension of sentence may be granted to a criminal sentenced to criminal detention or to fixed-term imprisonment of not more than three years if, according to the circumstances of his crime and his demonstration of repentance, it is certain that suspension of the sentence will not result in further harm to society.

Liu describes the translation of the terms “立功表现” and “悔罪表现” as “meritorious services” and “repentance” respectively, omitting the translation of the noun “表现” (Eng: performance). The acts of meritorious service and repentance are forms of performance and thus, the translation of “表现” (Eng: performance) would be redundant. Liu also emphasises the importance of being aware of the differences in syntactic structures between the source and target language. This will allow the meaning of both the English and Chinese translations to be accurate and adequate.

=== Advertising translation ===
Advertising translation focuses on preserving the persuasive aspect of an advertisement and adjusting it to suit the target market and culture in a translational action. With Skopos Theory, translation no longer focuses solely on the source text but also considers the skopos or purpose of the translation. In advertising translation, the Skopos rule plays an important role. As the target text is determined by its skopos, the translator is required to consider the culture and context of the audience and also possess thorough knowledge of the advertised product. Depending on the needs of the situation, the translator should bear the skopos in mind and determine if a ‘free’ or ‘faithful’ translation should be produced. For instance, the headline of an advertisement can undergo a dynamic translation to ensure that the function of a headline, which is to capture the attention of the target audience, is retained and adapted for a different culture consecutively.

=== Bible translation ===
There are many different translated versions of the Bible operating on different purposes. The New American Standard Bible aims to replicate the original Hebrew, Greek and Aramaic scripts as closely as possible. On the other hand, a version known as the International Children’s Bible is concerned with translating the language of the Bible into simple English to increase accessibility for readers with less proficiency in English. The target community dictates the skopos and influences the translators’ decision as to whether they will take a more literal or liberal approach, and it is often reflected in the introductory section of the Bible.

A single version may also serve multiple functions, hence it is possible for multiple purposes to be identified for the same target text, but it is argued that there should be a hierarchy of importance. Andy Cheung, writing on the application of the theory to Bible translation, suggests that it is possible to possess the function of translating the Bible into English for everyday usage and have a sub-skopos of ensuring accessibility for Second Language English users simultaneously. Cheung raises the fact that while Psalm 84:3a could have been translated as "Birds find nooks and crannies in your house", the version used in The Living Bible is more suitable: "Even the sparrows and swallows are welcome to come and nest among your altars". The sub-skopos does not support the usage of Anglo-Saxon idioms and a less metaphoric description will be easier for Second Language English users to comprehend.

== Reactions ==
=== Merits ===
Skopos Theory begets benefits such as streamlining the complications derived when translators and clients have different perceptions of a successful translation, prevalent in past translation theories. The new dimension that highlights a purpose can provide translators a faster and clearer direction to attain their goals of the target text.

Additionally, with the tool of a translation brief, it provides translators with an explicit guideline discussed with the client. This pinpoints appropriate translation strategies that the translator can adopt, fulfilling the factor of ‘adequacy’ and the needs of the client. For example, if a client requires the target text to be informative, the translator can adopt a strategy that accurately translates technical terms subjected to the cultural norms practiced in the community.

Skopos Theory also does not dictate a specific principle to adopt for a translation commission, providing translators the decisive power to choose from a variety of strategies. Translators focus on the target text that takes precedence over the source text while being able to account for a variety of source texts that are translated “consciously and consistently” too. This establishes new statuses of the source and target text, their relationship, the standards of a translational action and the liability of a translator.

Another merit to the Skopos Theory is that under it, students are presented with opportunities to develop their creativity, pragmatic and analytical skills as they have the liberty to choose from multiple translation strategies depending on the purpose of the translational action, such as domestication or foreignization. This promotes innovations through the concrete statement of a function and it does not confine students to a single theory while sociocultural factors evolve in a globalised society.

=== Criticisms ===
The flip side of the coin that involves the freedom to choose from different translation strategies based on the element of purpose, is that the theory may be seen as a vague framework that does not provide precise step-by-step orchestration. Students and translators in training do not have guidelines to follow diligently, possibly posing additional pressure and responsibilities on the translator to seek an adequate translation strategy. This can diminish their understanding and translation experiences for practical situations that are vital in the beginning stages of learning.

In addition, Skopos Theory adopts a top-down approach where the emphasis on the source text has been downplayed and overshadowed by the target text. According to the second rule of Skopos Theory, the source text acts as the originator of information that gets assimilated into the target text as the offer of information in a target language and culture (link to the rules above). This shift towards the target text is at the expense of the source text which is depowered in its linguistic nature of stylistic features and consequently, disregarding the minor semantic features of the target text catered specially for the target reader. Koller states that in a translation proper, the source text is an indicator that allows the target text to be measured independently based on the purpose of the translational action. However, Skopos Theory does not take much account of the source text but treats the end (target text) as its means.

Another issue is that literary and religious text involve particularly expressive and stylistic language where translations cannot operate based on the Skopos Theory. For example, bibles consist of artistic properties that engage prophetic visions, oratorical principles and analogies such as parables. Delving into the purpose of the translational action and not touching on an underlying linguistic analysis may not necessarily achieve the intended aptitude of the target language. Thus, Skopos Theory is not fully applicable to the wide stylistic genre of literature that includes literary texts. As an enhancement, literary works can adopt the Polysystem Theory postulated by Even Zohar where social, cultural, literary and historical properties are considered.

Skopos Theory as a functionalist theory inherently oversimplifies the linguistic situation of a text and that poses some difficulty in surveying contexts comprehensively. Vermeer and Reiß assertively frame disparate types of text relations using a general framework of skopos (purpose). This leaves out the intricacies of the source language and sentence meanings such as the lexical, syntactic and stylistic properties. This may result in the translational action being considered as an adaptation rather than a translation as Skopos Theory is made to be suitable for any text with a stated purpose.

It is also debatable that not all actions have an intention and not all translations involve a purpose as observed in literary texts and art that are stylistically complex, unlike in political and business texts. However, Vermeer argues that a translational action without a purpose would not be considered as an action to begin with. Moreover, certain art will have the sole purpose of purely existing, for example, ‘art for art’s sake. Nevertheless, the application of Skopos Theory can still be applied to non-literary texts that have established purposes, fulfilling formal equivalence.

Finally, the possibilities of employing an array of strategies are multifarious thus it may bring about inconsistencies in ensuring that the target text functions in its intended way which meets the expectations in its target language. The factor of ‘loyalty’ introduced by Nord can reduce this limitation by examining “the interpersonal relationship between the translator, the source-text sender, the target-text addressees and the initiator”. Thus, this emphasises the ethical responsibility that a translator has in communicating clearly with his/her clients during a translational interaction, acting as a target text “author”.

== See also ==
- Action Theory
- Bible Translation
- Cultural Translation
- Contrastive Analysis
- Descriptive Translation Studies
- Dynamic and Formal Equivalence
- Hans Vermeer
- Katharina Reiss
- Legal Translation
- Polysystem Theory
- Postcolonial Translation Theory
- Translation
- Translation Scholars
- Translation Studies
