= André Lefevere =

Belgian translator and linguist (1945–1996)

- Born: 1945; Belgium
- Died: 27 March 1996 (aged 50–51); United States
- Partner: Ria Vanderauwera
- Children: 1 daughter

Academic background
- Education: University of Essex
- Thesis: Prolegomena to a grammar of literary translation: An investigation into the process of literary translation based on an analysis of various translations of Catullus' 64th poem (1972)

Academic work
- Discipline: Translation studies Comparative literature
- Institutions: University of Texas at Austin

André Alphons Lefevere (1945 – 27 March 1996) was a translation theorist. He had studied at the University of Ghent (1964–1968) and then obtained his PhD at the University of Essex in 1972. When he died of acute leukemia, he was Professor of Germanic Studies at the University of Texas at Austin.

== Thought and influence ==
His most important contribution is in comparative literary studies and translation studies in particular. Drawing upon the notions of polysystem theorists like Itamar Even-Zohar, he theorized translation as a form of rewriting produced and read with a set of ideological and political constraints within the target language cultural system. Lefevere developed the idea of translation as a form of rewriting, which means that any text produced on the basis of another has the intention of adapting that other text to a certain ideology or to a certain poetics, and usually to both.

Lefevere, along with Gideon Toury, James S. Holmes and Jose Lambert, can be considered among the foremost scholars who have made translation studies an autonomous discipline. Together with Susan Bassnett he envisaged that "neither the word, nor the text, but the culture becomes the operational 'unit' of translation". This has been hailed by Edwin Gentzler, one of the leading synthesizers of translation theory, as the "real breakthrough for the field of translation studies"; it epitomized what is termed "the coming of age" of the discipline; an increasing intercultural or multicultural trend, that might be termed the postcolonial turn.

== Publications ==
- Translating Poetry: Seven Strategies and a Blueprint. Amsterdam: Van Gorcum, 1975
- Translating Literature: The German Tradition. Assen: Van Gorcum, 1977
- Literary Knowledge. Assen: Van Gorcum, 1977
- "Why waste our time on rewrites? The trouble with interpretation and the role of rewriting in an alternative paradigm", in The Manipulation of Literature: Studies in Literary Translation, edited by Theo Hermans, London & Sydney: Croom Helm. 1985
- Essays in Comparative Literature. Calcutta: Papyrus, 1989
- Translating Literature: Practice and Theory in a Comparative Literature Framework. New York: MLA, 1992
- Translation, Rewriting, and the Manipulation of Literary Fame. London/New York:Routledge, 1992
- Constructing Cultures (with Susan Bassnett). London: Multilingual Matters, 1997

as editor

- Poëzie van 1720 tot 1920. Amsterdam: Coutinho, 1989
- Translation – Culture/History: A Source Book. London/New York: Routledge, 1992

as translator

- Herta Müller, Traveling on one Leg (transl. with Valentina Glajar). Northwestern University Press, 1999; 2010.
