= Sense-for-sense translation =

Meaning-for-meaning translation of a text

Sense-for-sense translation is the oldest norm for translating. It fundamentally means translating the meaning of each whole sentence before moving on to the next, and stands in normative opposition to word-for-word translation (also known as literal translation).

== History ==
Jerome, a Roman Catholic priest, theologian, and historian coined the term "sense-for-sense" when he developed this translation method when was tasked by Pope Damasus to review the existing translations of the Gospel and produce a more reliable Latin version. He described this method in his "Letter to Pammachius", where he said that, "except of course in the case of Holy Scripture, where even the syntax contains a mystery," he translates non verbum e verbo sed sensum de sensu: not word for word but sense for sense. He adopted a framework that corrected the mistakes of previous translators as well as the alterations of critical scholars and the errors made by careless copyists by collecting the oldest Greek manuscripts, which he compared with the Old Latin versions, and translated the scripture into a version that is close as possible to the original meaning.

Jerome did not invent the concept of sense-for-sense translation. It is believed that it was first proposed by Cicero in De optimo genere oratorum ("The Best Kind of Orator"). In this text, he said that in translating from Greek to Latin, "I did not think I ought to count them out to the reader like coins, but to pay them by weight, as it were." Cicero did not mention sense-for-sense in his works but it is considered to be a type of "segmental" theory, which is attributed to him and Horace. This translation approach is based on segmentation, which considers how long a segment (word, phrase, or sentence) is before moving on to the next.

Jerome was not the originator of the term "word-for-word" either. It has possibly also been borrowed from Cicero as well, or possibly from Horace, who warned the writer interested in retelling ancient tales in an original way Nec verbo verbum curabit reddere fidus / interpres: "not to try to render them word for word [like some] faithful translator."

Some have read that passage in Horace differently. Boethius in 510 CE and Johannes Scotus Eriugena in the mid-9th century read it to mean that translating literally is "the fault/blame of the faithful interpreter/translator," and fear that they have incurred it. Burgundio of Pisa in the 1170s and Sir Richard Sherburne in 1702 recognize that Horace is advising not translators but original writers, but still assume that he is calling all translation literal. Finally, John Denham in 1656 and André Lefevere in 1992 take Horace to be warning translators against translating literally.

== Similar concepts ==
=== Paraphrase ===
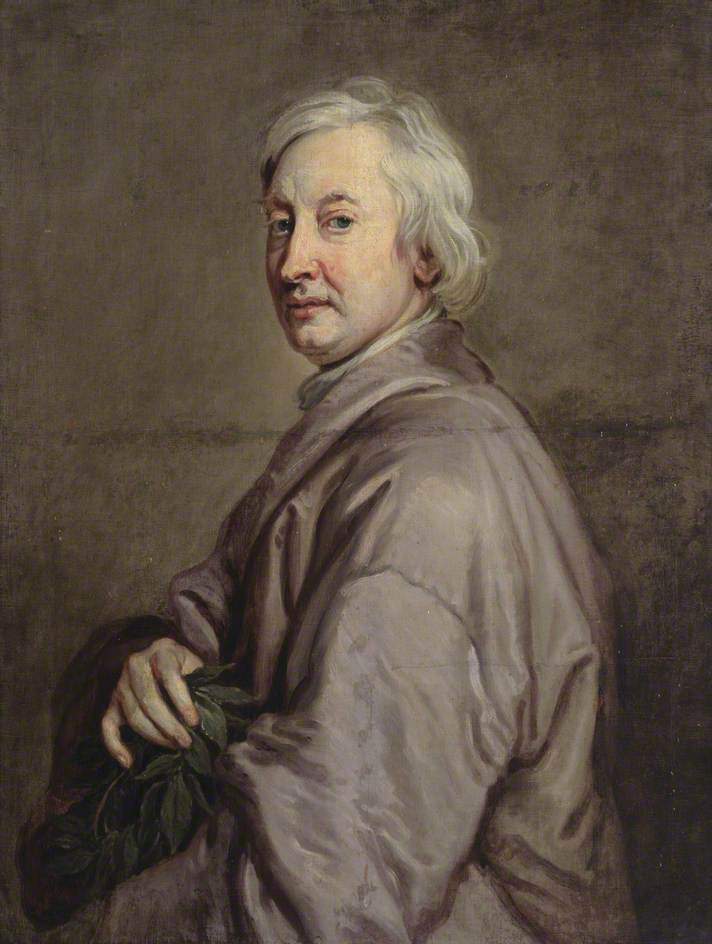
John Dryden by Sir Godfrey Kneller

In John Dryden’s 1680 preface to his translation of Ovid's Epistles, he proposed dividing translation into three parts called: metaphrase, paraphrase and imitation. Metaphrase is word-for-word and line by line translation from one language into another. Paraphrase is sense-for-sense translation where the message of the author is kept but the words are not so strictly followed as the sense, which too can be altered or amplified. Imitation is the use of either metaphrase or paraphrase but the translator has the liberty to choose which is appropriate and how the message will be conveyed.

=== Leaving the reader in peace ===
In 1813, during his “Über die Verschiedenen Methoden des Übersetzens” lecture, Friedrich Schleiermacher proposed the idea where “[E]ither the translator leaves the author in peace, as much as possible, and moves the reader towards him, or he leaves the reader in peace, as much as possible, and he moves the author towards him”.

=== Dynamic equivalence ===
In 1964, Eugene Nida described translation as having two different types of equivalence: formal and dynamic equivalence. Formal equivalence is when there is focus on the message itself (in both form and content); the message in the target language should match the message in the source language as closely as possible. In dynamic equivalence, there is less concern with matching the message in the target language with the message in the source language; the goal is to produce the same relationship between target text and target audience as there was with the original source text and its audience.

=== Communicative translation ===
In 1981, Peter Newmark referred to translation as either semantic (word-for-word) or communicative (sense-for-sense). He stated that semantic translation is one that is source language bias, literal and faithful to the source text and communicative translation is target language bias, free and idiomatic. A semantic translation's goal is to stay as close as possible to the semantic and syntactic structures of the source language, allowing the exact contextual meaning of the original. A communicative translation's goal is to produce an effect on the readers as close as possible to that as produced upon the readers of the original.

=== Idiomatic translation ===
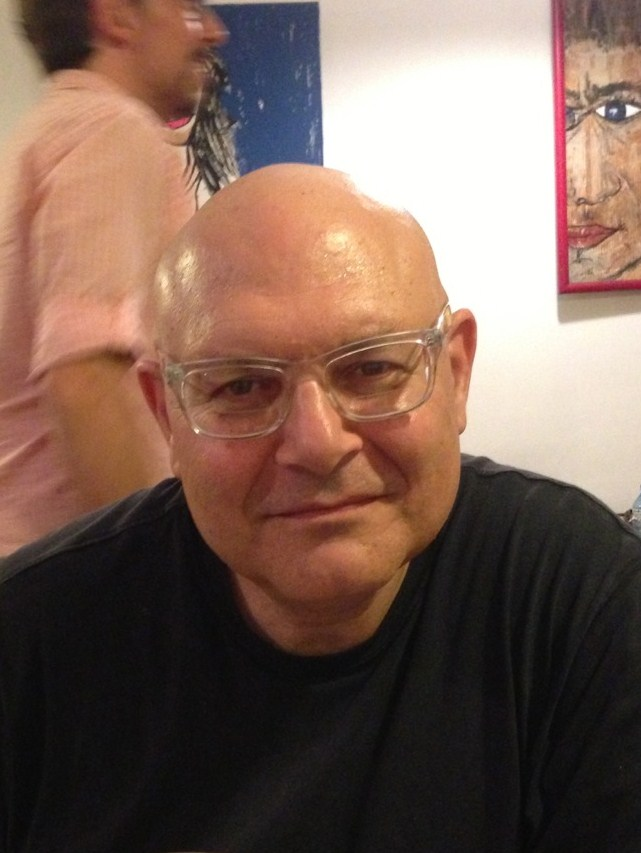
Lawrence Venuti

In addition to these concepts, in 1990, Brian Mossop presented his concept of idiomatic and unidiomatic translation. Idiomatic translation is when the message of the source text is conveyed the way a target language writer would convey it, rather than staying to the way in which it was conveyed in the source text. Unidiomatic translation is innovative and translates individual words.

=== Domesticated translation ===
In 1994, also in modern translation studies, Lawrence Venuti introduced the concepts of domestication and foreignization, which are based on concepts from Friedrich Schleiermacher's 1813 lecture. Domestication is the adaption of culture-specific terms or cultural context, where as foreignization is the preservation of the original cultural context of the source text (in terms of settings, names, etc.).

Venuti also described domestication as being fluent and transparent strategies that result in acculturation, where “a cultural other is domesticated, made intelligible”. Schleiermacher's distinction between "bringing the author to the reader" (domestication) and "taking the reader to the author" (foreignization), dealt with a social concern and Venuti's distinction between domestication and foreignization deals with ethical principles.

== See also ==
- Cultural translation
- Phono-semantic matching
