= Hans Vermeer =

German linguist and translation scholar (1930-2010)

- Born: 24 September 1930; Iserlohn, Germany
- Died: 4 February 2010 (aged 79); Heidelberg, Germany
- Known for: Skopos theory

Academic work
- Discipline: Translation studies
- Institutions: University of Mainz, Heidelberg University, University of Innsbruck, Boğaziçi University, and Okan University
- Main interests: Portuguese language, German studies, linguistics and indology, translation studies, history of translation and interpreting

Hans Josef Vermeer (24 September 1930 – 4 February 2010), was a German linguist and translation scholar.

Vermeer was Professor of Linguistics at the University of Mainz in Germersheim and held a chair in Translation Studies at Heidelberg University. After his retirement, he became a visiting professor at national and international universities. In his final years, he returned to the universities of Mainz and Heidelberg. On 17 January 2010, just before his death, he was awarded an honorary doctorate by the University of Mainz.

== Life and academic career ==
Hans Vermeer was born in Iserlohn in 1930. In 1950 he completed his secondary education in the same town. That same year, he took up an undergraduate degree in English and Spanish translation at Heidelberg University, which he completed in 1952. In 1953, after spending some time in Portugal at the University of Lisbon, he obtained an undergraduate degree in Portuguese translation as well. A year later, he received his graduate degree in Portuguese translation and interpreting. From 1954 to 1962 he taught Portuguese at the Department of Translation and Interpreting at Heidelberg University. In 1962, he was awarded a PhD degree from Heidelberg University for his dissertation on adjectival and verbal color terms in Indo-European languages and the issue of their translation. From 1962 to 1964, he taught languages of South Asia such as Urdu and Hindi at the Department of Modern Languages in Heidelberg. In 1968 he achieved Habilitation by completing a postdoctoral thesis on the structure of Central South Asian languages, contributing to the sprachbund issue. From 1968 to 1970, he worked as an assistant professor at the Department of Linguistics at Heidelberg University. In 1970, he transferred to the University of Mainz, Faculty of Translation and Interpreting Studies, Linguistics and Cultural Studies, where he would hold the Chair of General and Applied Linguistics until 1983. From 1984 to 1992, he was Chair Professor of General Translation Studies with Special Reference to Portuguese at Heidelberg University. In 1992, he retired from his chair but continued teaching. He was also appointed visiting professor at a number of universities: University of Innsbruck (1999-2002), Boğaziçi University in Istanbul (2002-2003) and Okan University, also located in Istanbul (2004-2007). He returned to the Faculty of Translation and Interpreting Studies, Linguistics and Cultural Studies at the University of Mainz as a visiting professor in 2008.

Vermeer is best known for establishing skopos theory, but published widely on a variety of topics in linguistics, translation and interpreting. He authored more than 80 articles, chapters and books. In 2012, a special issue of mTm was published to commemorate his work and life. In addition to his achievements in academia, Hans Vermeer was a translator for Portuguese, French and Basque, and worked as an interpreter for Portuguese.

== Selected works ==
- Adjektivische und verbale Farbausdrücke in den indogermanischen Sprachen mit ē-Verben. Ein Beitrag zur Frage der Wortarten und zum Problem der Übersetzbarkeit. Heidelberg, Julius Groos, 1963.
- (with Heinz Walz and Heinrich Klebes) Sprache und Entwicklungshilfe: Bedeutung und Möglichkeit der Vermittlung von Sprachkenntnissen und Auslandskunde an deutsche Fachleute im Rahmen der Entwicklungshilfe für Afrika und Asien. Heidelberg, Julius Groos, 1963.
- (with Aryendra Sharma) Einführung in die Grammatik der modernen Hindi. Studienausgabe. Heidelberg, Julius Groos, 1963.
- Untersuchungen zum Bau zentral-süd-asiatischer Sprachen: Ein Beitrag zur Sprachbundfrage. Heidelberg, Julius Groos, 1969.
- Einführung in die linguistische Terminologie. Darmstadt, Wissenschaftliche Buchgesellschaft, 1971.
- Allgemeine Sprachwissenschaft: Eine Einführung. Freiburg, Rombach, 1972.
- Ein Rahmen für eine allgemeine Translationstheorie. Lebende Sprachen 23:3, 1978, pp. 99–102.
- Aufsätze zur Translationstheorie. Heidelberg, 1983.
- (with Katharina Reiß) Grundlegung einer allgemeinen Translationstheorie. Tübingen, Niemeyer, 1984. Translated into English by Christiane Nord as Towards a general theory of translational action: Skopos theory explained. English reviewed by Martina Dudenhöfer. Manchester, St. Jerome, 2013.
- What does it mean to translate? Indian Journal of Applied Linguistics 13, 1987, pp. 25–33.
- Skopos and commission in translational action. In Readings in translation theory, edited by Andrew Chesterman. Helsinki, Oy Finn Lectura, 1989, 173-187. Translated into English by Andrew Chesterman.
- (with Heidrun Witte) Mögen Sie Zistrosen? Scenes & frames & channels im translatorischen Handeln. Heidelberg, Julius Groos, 1990.
- Skizzen zu einer Geschichte der Translation - Band 1; Band 2. Frankfurt am Main, IKO-Verlag für Interkulturelle Kommunikation, 1991.
- Describing nonverbal behaviour in the Odyssey: Scenes and verbal frames as translation problems. In Advances in nonverbal communication: Sociocultural, clinical, esthetic and literary perspectives, edited by Fernando Poyatos. Amsterdam/Philadelphia, John Benjamins, 1992, 285-299.
- A skopos theory of translation (some arguments for and against). Heidelberg, TEXTconTEXT, 1996.
- Translation and the "meme". Target - International Journal of Translation Studies 9:1, 1997, pp. 155–166.
- Starting to unask what translatology is about. Target - International Journal of Translation Studies 10:1, 1998, pp. 41–68.
- Das Übersetzen in Renaissance und Humanismus (15. und 16. Jahrhundert) – Band 1: Westeuropa; Band 2: Der deutschsprachige Raum, Literatur und Indices. Heidelberg, TEXTconTEXT, 2000.
- Skopos and commission in translational action. In The translation studies reader, edited by Lawrence Venuti, advisory editor Mona Baker. London/New York, Routledge, 2000, 221-232. Translated into English by Andrew Chesterman.
- Luhmann's "Social Systems" theory: Preliminary fragments for a theory of translation. Berlin, Frank & Timme, 2006.
- Ausgewählte Vorträge zur Translation und anderen Themen. Selected papers on translation and other subjects. Berlin, Frank & Timme, 2007.
