= Mänttäri =

Mänttäri is a Finnish surname. Notable people with the surname include:

- Aune Mänttäri (born 1936), Finnish politician
- Ulla Mänttäri, Finnish orienteer

== See also ==
- Justa Holz-Mänttäri (born 1936), Finnish translation scholar
