= Bruno Osimo =

Italian writer and scholar

Bruno Osimo (born 14 December 1958, Milan, Italy) is an Italian fiction writer, translator, and translation studies scholar.

A disciple of Peeter Torop's, professor of Translation Studies at the Civica Scuola Interpreti e Traduttori «Altiero Spinelli», translator from Russian and English to Italian, he has developed Charles Sanders Peirce's, Lev Vygotsky's, and Roman Jakobson's theories. He has published three novels, Dizionario affettivo della lingua ebraica, Bar Atlantic and Disperato erotico fox. He has edited the Italian edition of works by Alexander Lyudskanov, Anton Popovič, Peeter Torop, Juri Lotman, Roman Jakobson. He is the author of an online Translation course translated in 10 languages, the Logos Translation Course, published by the Logos Group He is a member of the European Society for Translation Studies.

== Translation Studies ==
Bruno Osimo's approach to translation studies integrates translation activities as a mental process, not only between languages (interlingual translation) but also within the same language (intralingual translation) and between verbal and non-verbal systems of signs (intersemiotic translation). Along with linguistics, Osimo stresses the importance of cultural awareness in developing quality in translation, profiling the translator as an intercultural mediator.

"Translation is the creation of a language of mediation between various cultures. The historic analysis of translation presupposes the readiness of the researcher to interpret the languages of the translators belonging to different ages, and also to interpret their ability to create new languages of mediation (Osimo 2002, Torop 2009). "

A central concept of translation studies described by Bruno Osimo is Code-switching, a key characteristic of multilingual individuals.

As a disciple of Peeter Torop, Bruno Osimo identifies translation parameters requesting a selection of appropriate translation strategies, oriented on the content of the source text (transposition), or on the code itself (recoding).

Among his published translations, he has made available in English the works of Alexander Lyudskanov, a pioneer in Machine translation.

== Publications ==
- Peeter Torop,Total Translation. Types of Translation Processes in Culture, Milan, 2026, ISBN 9791281358782;
- Semiotics for Beginners. Survival Guide for the Ordinary Citizen, Milan, 2022, ISBN 9788831462815;
- The Translation of Realia: How to render words that mean culture-specific things, Milan, 2022, ISBN 9788831462907;
- Primo Levi. Miti d'oggi, Milan: Francesco Brioschi, 2021.
- Psychological Aspects of Translation, Milan, 2020, ISBN 9788831462631;
- Cognitive distortion, translation distortion, and poetic distortion as semiotic shifts, Milan, 2020, ISBN 9791281358034;
- Literary Translation and Terminological Precision, Milan, 2020, ISBN 9788898467051;
- Roman Jakobson's Translation Handbook, Milano: 2020, ISBN 9788898467907;
- The Translation of culture. How a society is perceived by other societies, Milan, 2019 ISBN 9791281358010;
- Juri Lotman’s Translation Handbook, Milano: 2020, ISBN 9788831462877;
- Prototext-metatext translation shifts: A model with examples based on Bible translation, StreetLib SRL, 2018, ISBN 9788898467198;
- Translation Studies. Contributions from Eastern Europe, Milan, 2021, ISBN 9788831462266;
- Dictionary of Translation Studies: with terms of semiotics, textology, linguistics, stylistics, Milan, 2019, ISBN 9788898467761;
- Basic notions of translation theory: Semiotics - Linguistics - Psychology, Milan, 2019, ISBN 9788831462860;
- History of Translation, Milan, 2019, ISBN 9788831462839;
- Breviario del rivoluzionario da giovane, Milan: Marcos y Marcos, 2018;
- Disperato erotico fox: manuale di ballo liscio, Milan: Marcos y Marcos, 2014;
- Bar Atlantic, Milan: Marcos y Marcos, 2012;
- Dizionario affettivo della lingua ebraica, Milan: Marcos y Marcos, 2011 (2nd edn. 2016)
- Manuale del traduttore: guida pratica con glossario, 3rd edn., Milan: Hoepli 2011;
  - in English: Handbook of Translation Studies: A reference volume for professional translators and M.A. students, Milan, 2019, ISBN 9788898467778;
- Propedeutica della traduzione: corso introduttivo con tabelle sinottiche, 2nd edn., Milan: Hoepli, 2010;
- La traduzione saggistica dall’inglese: guida pratica con versioni guidate e glossario, Milan: Hoepli, 2006;
- Traduzione a qualità: la valutazione in ambito accademico e professionale, Milan: Hoepli, 2004;
- Logos Online Translation course, 2004;
- Storia della traduzione: riflessioni sul linguaggio traduttivo dall'antichità ai contemporanei, Milan: Hoepli, 2002;
  - in Spanish: Historia de la traducción: reflexiones en torno del lenguaje traductivo desde la antigüedad hasta los contemporáneos, trans. by M. Cristina Secci, Paidós, 2013.
- Traduzione e nuove tecnologie. Informatica e internet per traduttori, Milan: Hoepli, 2001.
- Corso di traduzione, vol. 1. Elementi fondamentali, Modena: Guaraldi Logos, 2000.

Examples of the works in which some publications of Bruno Osimo are quoted:

1. Eco, Umberto (2003). Dire quasi la stessa cosa. Esperienze di traduzione. Milano: Bompiani, p. 374;
2. Salmon, Laura (2003). Teoria della traduzione. Storia, scienza, professione. Miano: Avallardi, p. 272;
3. Bertazzoli, Raffaella (2006). La traduzione: teorie e metodi. Roma: Carocci, pp. 15, 21,23-24, 26, 53, 78–79, 87,92, 94, 102 and 105;
4. Morini, Massimiliano (2007). La traduzione. Teorie strumenti pratiche. Milano: Sironi, p.p. 116,121,124,131 and 142;
5. Cerrato, Mariatonia (2009). Tradurre la scienza. Profili teorici e pratica. Legnano: Edicom, pp. 19–22, 28, 37 and 49.
