= Theo Hermans =

Belgian scholar (born 1948)

- Born: 1948 (age 77–78); Assent, Belgium

Academic background
- Education: University of Ghent, University of Warwick

Academic work
- Discipline: Translation studies
- Institutions: University College London, University of Manchester, Chinese University of Hong Kong, and University of Algiers
- Notable works: The Manipulation of Literature: Studies in Literary Translation (1985)

Theo Hermans (born 1948) is a Belgian scholar best known for his work in Translation Studies. He is currently Professor of Dutch and Comparative Literature at University College London. He is a corresponding member of the Flemish Academy and an Honorary Research Fellow at the University of Manchester’s Centre for Translation and Intercultural Studies. Since October 2006 he holds the honorary post of adjunct professor at the Department of Translation at the Chinese University of Hong Kong. Hermans is also editor of the journal Dutch Crossing: Journal of Low Countries Studies.

== Biography ==
Theo Hermans was born in 1949 in Assent, Belgium. He studied English, German and Dutch at the University of Ghent, (Belgium) and then moved to the United Kingdom for a MA in Literary Translation. As German was not offered at the time, he started his PhD in Comparative Literature at the University of Warwick. In 1973, he departed for Algeria and taught English at the Department of Foreign Languages at the University of Algiers. Two years later he returned, completed his PhD, and started to work at Bedford College. In 1993, he started working at University College London.

== Research and influence ==
His first works concerned the history of translation in the Low Countries. However, his most influential work was The Manipulation of Literature, where he criticized the second-rate value assigned to translations in the hierarchy of literary texts and defended the progress of Translation Studies as a discipline in its own right. It was the first collection of scientific approaches to translation. In recent years, he has focused on the translator's presence in translated texts. His discourse on the reciprocal internal and external pressures that affect translation norms offer tools that conceptualizes the relationship between structures of power and disciplinary transformation.

In several publications, Hermans described the functionalist aspect to his translation theories. He applied Niklas Luhmann's Social Systems Theory (SST), for instance, in his attempt to describe what constitutes translation activity or the accounting for its heteronomy.

Together with other scholars such Jose Lambert and Gideon Toury, Hermans built upon the work of Itamar Even-Zohar, particularly his functional approach to translation studies, which broke down the barrier between translation and transfer research. He is also known for the use of metaphor in translation for his work on late medieval and Renaissance period. Hermans maintained that literal translations have dominated the medieval regime and this view has been supported by other historians such as Peter Burke. Like other scholars such as Lambert, Even-Zohar, Raymond Van den Broeck, and Kitty Van Leuven-Zwart, Hermans has introduced models that sought to describe the translation process and to establish universal norms and patterns that govern translational behavior.

== Works ==
=== Author ===
- Door eenen engen hals: Nederlandse beschouwingen over vertalen 1550-1670, 1996.
- Translation in Systems, 1999.
- The Conference of the Tongues, 2007.

=== Editor ===
- The Manipulation of Literature, 1985.
- The Flemish Movement: A Documentary History 1780-1990, 1992.
- Vertalen historisch bezien, 1995.
- The Babel Guide to Dutch and Flemish Fiction, 2001.
- Crosscultural Transgressions, 2002.
- Translating Others (2 vols), 2006.
