= Domestication (disambiguation) =

Domestication is the process whereby a population of animals is changed at the genetic level, accentuating traits desired by humans.

Domestication may also refer to:

- Domestication theory, an approach in science, technology studies and media studies that describes the processes by which innovations are 'tamed' or appropriated by their users
- Domestication and foreignization, strategies in translation regarding the degree to which translators make a text conform to the target culture
