= Dutch Crossing (disambiguation) =

The term Dutch Crossing may refer to:

- Yankee Dutch Crossing, which is an American modification of an English country dance named Dutch Crossing
- Dutch Crossing, which is an academic journal about Dutch culture and language
