= Olena Shablii =

Ukrainian academic

- Олена Анатоліївна Шаблій
- Born: 21 December 1975; Kyiv, Ukraine
- Education: Sc.D., Philology
- Alma mater: Taras Shevchenko National University of Kyiv (KNU)
- Scientific career
- Fields: legal translation
- Institutions: Taras Shevchenko National University of Kyiv (KNU)

Olena Shablii (Ukrainian: Шаблій Олена Анатоліївна 21 December 1975 Kyiv, Ukraine head of the Center of Intercultural Specialized Communication and Terminology Harmonization at the Science Park "Taras Shevchenko University of Kyiv", teacher at the Taras Shevchenko National University of Kyiv (KNU) in Ukraine. Since 1998, she has been teaching translation studies and legal German at KNU, since 2012 at the Faculty of Law, Department of Foreign Languages.

== Dissertations ==
In 2002, Shablii wrote her 1st (candidate's) dissertation ‘Interlingual Terminological Homonymy as a Problem of Terminological Lexicography and Translation Studies’ and in 2013 her 2nd (doctor's) dissertation ‘Theoretical Bases and Methodology of German-Ukrainian Legal Translation’. Shablii has published several books ‘Translation of Legal Texts’ (2008), German-Ukrainian Legal Translation: Methods, Problems, Prospects (2012), is co-author of ‘Weißbuch zur Reform der ukrainischen Juristischen Ausbildung: Deutsch-Ukrainische Erfahrungen’ (2015), and author of over 50 papers in peer-reviewed journals.

Shablii was visiting professor at the Herder Institute of Leipzig University, Germany (2011), the University of Bologna, Italy (2014), and LMU Munich, Germany (2015). Since 2015, she is president of the NGO German-Ukrainian Jurisprudential Dialogue and coordinator of several German-Ukrainian projects, among them several conferences and workshops on Reform of Ukrainian legal education and German-Ukrainian Legal Translation School.
