= Cultural translation =

Philosophy of translation

Cultural translation is the practice of translation while respecting and showing cultural differences. This kind of translation solves some issues linked to culture, such as dialects, food or architecture.

The main issues that cultural translation must solve consist of translating a text as showing the cultural differences of that text while also respecting the source culture as well.

== Translation of cultures ==
Cultural translation is studied through cultural anthropology, a field of anthropology focused on cultural issues among humans. This discipline questions translation through cultural differences. Indeed, translation studies are not only based on language issues, but also on cultural contexts between people.

An anthropological translator of cultures needs to deal with the issues between the source and the target language, that is to say he must respect at the same time the cultural source of point of view and the target culture. Wilhelm von Humboldt shared this opinion of translation in a letter addressed to A. W. Schlegel, dated July 23, 1796: "All translation seems to me simply an attempt to solve an impossible task. Every translator is doomed to be done in by one of two stumbling blocks: he will either stay too close to the original, at the cost of taste and the language of his nation, or he will adhere too closely to the characteristics peculiar to his nation, at the cost of the original. The medium between the two is not only difficult, but downright impossible".

== Skepticism towards translation of cultures ==
Some anthropologists raise objections to translation of cultures. According to these researchers, culture seeks a certain coherence that can be found in people's thinking and practices. In this case, a cultural translator must have a much more widespread knowledge than the text actually provides.

Besides, translation of cultures cannot be as equal as it should be, as some cultures and societies remain dominant compared to others, therefore power is a limit to translation of cultures. Indeed, within a translation of cultures, the target language may dominate the source culture in order to make the text comprehensible in a sense of culture for the readers. The meaning of culture is quite difficult to understand, therefore translation of cultures is certainly limited, all the more so borders exist between cultures, which must be thus distinguished. This limit of translation of cultures was also explained in the theory of Edward Sapir, an American linguist and anthropologist: "The worlds in which different societies live are distinct worlds, not merely the same world with different labels attached". "Each linguistic community has its own perception of the world, which differs from that of other linguistic communities, implies the existence of different worlds determined by language".

Some linguists assume that untranslatability does not only come from linguistic limits but also from cultural barriers within translation. According to some linguists, such as C.L. Wren, differences of point of view between peoples relatively impose narrow limits to cultural translatability. The theory of universal translatability is disapproved by some researchers, like André Martinet, who is convinced that human experience cannot be well communicated because it is unique. Catford rationalised this theory in his book Linguistic Theory of Translation: "Cultural untranslatability arises when a situational feature, functionally relevant for the source language text, is completely absent from the culture of which the TL is a part. For instance, the names of some institutions, clothes, foods and abstract concepts, amongst others."

Anton Popovič also assumes that there is a difference between linguistic and cultural untranslatability, an idea that he defends in A Dictionary for the Analysis of Literary Translation: "A situation in which the linguistic elements of the original cannot be replaced adequately in structural, linear, functional or semantic terms in consequence of a lack of denotation or connotation".

Dominance of some cultures is consequently obvious within the World History, for instance during the time when colonialism represented a main ideology among many different countries. Indeed, some cultures were represented as pure and as the essence of the world's functioning. One should say that translation of cultures may reflect an inequality between cultures and peoples. Furthermore, translation of cultures provides other issues, such as conflicts between cultures and historical changes.

== A two-fold process ==
Translation may be obviously linked to exchanges, migration and mobility, terms which are the essence of globalization. Therefore, this discipline presents a two-fold process, that is to say the transnational (across borders) and translational (exchange of translations) concepts. This two-fold process withdraws the separation between the source and the target language and enables to negotiate cultural differences.

These global 'negotiations of difference' are especially crucial in postcolonial settings and can be read as 'performative negotiations of cultural differences in a process of de- and recontextualization'. In this, the primary aim of the translator must be to find 'conceptual equivalence' between the source and target of what is meant to be translated.

== Culture and civilization ==
Cultural translation obviously implies the notion of culture, which needs here to be defined, in order to understand well the term cultural translation. Culture offers two different meanings: the first one defines culture as a civilized society in a developed country, whereas the second one considers culture as a whole set of behaviors and ways of life that a people shares. As previously explained, culture gets an important role and meaning in translation. According to Katan, culture is a shared model of the world, a hierarchical model of beliefs, values and strategies which can guide action and interaction of people. Culture can be acquired through diverse ways, like education.

The term civilization is defined as a developed human society which managed to create its own culture through people. Through this concept, a translator is able to translate a text by solving the issue of a culture's development. In this case, Newmark is convinced that translation is culturally valued, that is to say translation improves cultures' development within the entire world. As civilization lead to the creation of evident ways of communication, such alphabet, dictionaries and to a tremendous development of languages and literatures, this process raised new questions in cultural translation.

Culture has a huge influence on society and politics of a country, in terms of ideology. According to some translation researchers such as Even-Zohar, Susan Bassnett and Trivedi, culture is also linked to the will of power and to the way people pretend to this power. In this sense, translation deals with making systems of ideologies comprehensible for the readers. Translation of cultures is therefore linked to ethics and explains a new way of thinking. This kind of translation must show the context and the personal way of thinking through translated texts.
