= Peeter Torop =

Estonian semiotician (born 1950)

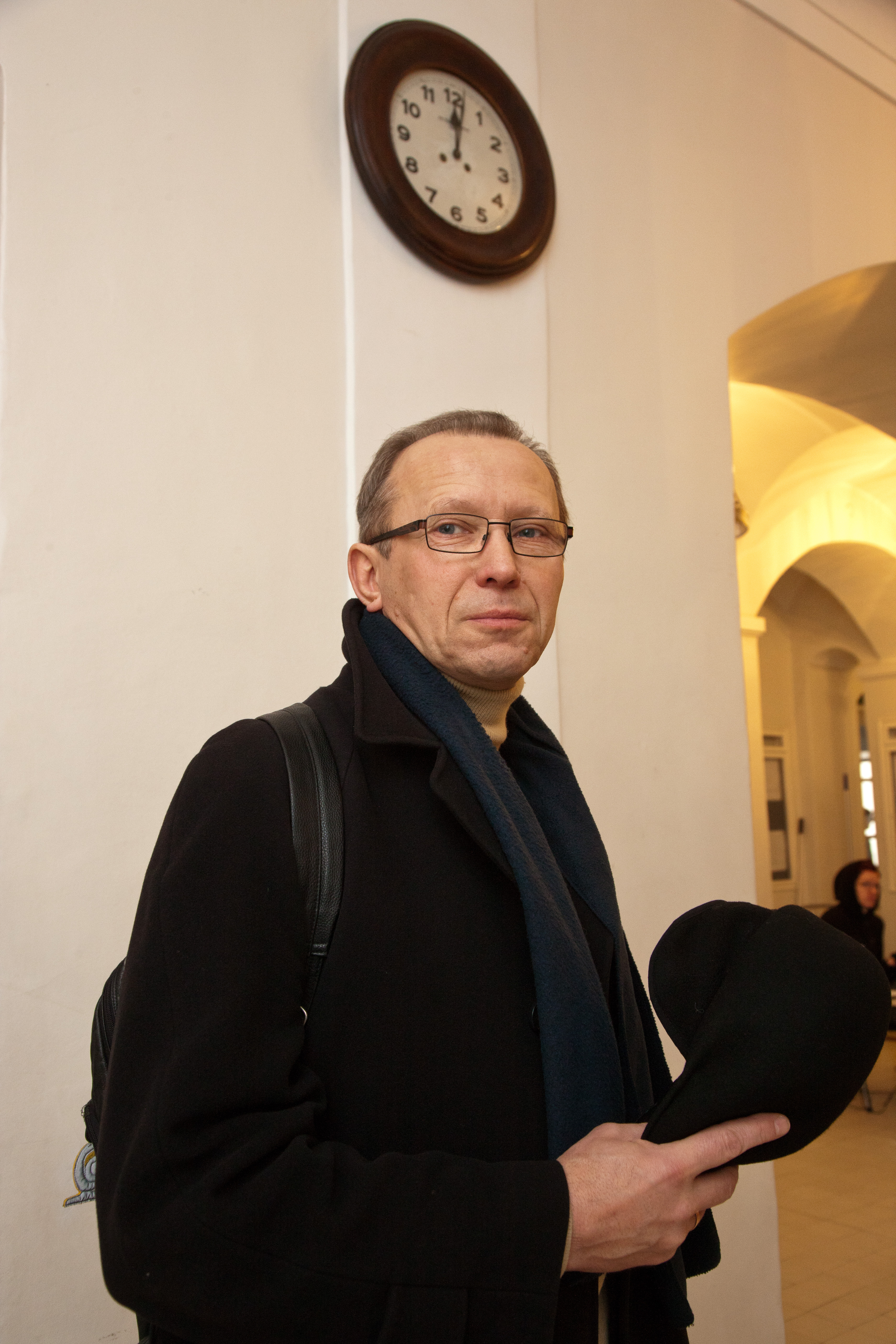
Peeter Torop (2011)

Peeter Torop (born November 28, 1950, in Tallinn, Estonia) is an Estonian semiotician. Following Roman Jakobson, he expanded the scope of the semiotic study of translation to include intratextual, intertextual, and extratextual translation and stressing the productivity of the notion of translation in general semiotics. He is a co-editor of the journal Sign Systems Studies, the oldest international semiotic periodical, the chairman of the Estonian Semiotics Association and professor of semiotics of culture at Tartu University.

He is known in translation studies above all for his PhD dissertation Total translation, published in Russian in 1995, in Italian in 2000 (1st edition) and 2010 (2nd edition), in English in 2026, ISBN 979-12-813-5878-2, edited by Bruno Osimo, in Ukrainian in 2015, in Estonian in 2024.
