= Martha Cheung =

Chinese translator and scholar (1953–2013)

Martha Pui Yiu Cheung (Chinese: 張佩瑤; 1953–2013) was a researcher and scholar in Translation Studies, Chair Professor in Translation and Director of the Centre for Translation at Hong Kong Baptist University. She was best known for the first volume of her Anthology on Chinese Discourse on Translation, published in 2006. She was working on the second volume of the anthology at the time of her death. Cheung was also noted for her works in translation theory, literary translation, and translation history.

== Contributions ==
Professor Cheung was a leading scholar in the internationalisation of Translation Studies, drawing attention to the Eurocentric focus of the discipline and helping to raise the profile of Chinese translation theory. Her work on the special issue of The Translator helped provide non-European perspectives by focusing on Asian translation matters. She was interested in the role of comparative research in translation in her effort to describe Chinese translation concepts to non-Chinese readers. Cheung opted to explain foreign concepts in familiar terms in order to negate the differences between cultures and tradition.

The Hong Kong Academy of the Humanities awards the Martha Cheung Book Prize in Translation in her honour.

== Scholarly works ==
- (1997) 'Oxford Anthology of Contemporary Chinese Drama' Oxford: Oxford University Press
- (2005) ‘To Translate’ Means ‘To Exchange’? A New Interpretation of the Earliest Chinese Attempts to Define Translation (‘fanyi’). Target, vol. 17 issue 1, 27-48.
- (2006) An Anthology of Chinese Discourse on Translation. Volume 1: From Earliest Times to the Buddhist Project (edited), Manchester: St Jerome Publishing
- (2009) Chinese Discourses on Translation: Positions and Perspectives (edited). Special issue of The Translator, vol. 15, issue 2
- (2009) Representation, Intervention and Mediation: A Translation Anthologist’s Reflections on the Complexities of Translating China. Translating China. Eds. Luo Xuanmin and He Yuanjian. Bristol: Multilingual Matters, 171-188.
- (2010) Rethinking Activism: The Power and Dynamics of Translation in China during the Late Qing Period (1840-1911), Text and Context: Essays on Translation and Interpreting in Honour of Ian Mason. Eds Baker, Mona, Maeve Olohan and María Calzada Pérez. Manchester: St. Jerome, 237-258.
- (2011) The (un)importance of flagging Chineseness, Translation Studies, vol. 4, issue 1, 41-57
- (2011) Reconceptualizing Translation – Some Chinese Endeavours, META: Journal des traducteurs vol. 56, issue 1, 1-19.
- (2012) The mediated nature of knowledge and the pushing-hands approach to research on translation history, Translation Studies, vol. 5, issue 2, 156-171

== Translations ==
- 1992: Han Shaogong, Homecoming? And Other Stories, 1992
- 1993: Liu Sola, Blue Sky Green Sea and Other Stories, 1993
- 1997: Leung Ping-kwan, Foodscape, 1997
- 1997: An Oxford Anthology of Contemporary Chinese Drama, co-editor and co-translator with Jane C.C. Lai.
- 1997: 100 Excerpts from Zen Buddhist Texts, co-translator with Jane C.C. Lai
- 1998: Oxford Children's Encyclopedia (9 volumes, 2082 entries), Editor-in-Chief (Chinese translation)
- 2002: Leung Ping-kwan, Traveling with a Bitter Melon, 2002
- 2004: An Illustrated Chinese Materia Medica in Hong Kong (506 entries), Editor-in-Chief (English translation).
