= Sherry Simon =

Canadian translator

Sherry Simon is Canadian translation scholar, who is best known for her work in translation and gender.

== Biography ==
Simon is a Professor in the Department of French Studies at Concordia University. She has also held the position of Canada Research Chair in Translation and Cultural History (York University, 2005) and served as Director of Concordia’s interdisciplinary PhD in Humanities Program.

== Research and impact ==
Simon's early work on translation and gender has had a great impact when it comes to feminist issues in translation studies.

== Selected publications ==
- Sherry Simon. Gender in Translation - cultural identity and the politics of transmission. London & New York: Routledge
- Sherry Simon. "Yiddish and Multilingual Urban Space in Montreal", in Laurence Roth et Nadia Valman (dirs.), The Routledge Handbook of Contemporary Jewish Cultures, London / New York, Routledge, 2014, p. 272-285.
- Sherry Simon. "The City in Translation: «Urban Cultures of Central Europe» ", in Elke Brems, Reine Meylaerts and Luc van Doorslaer (dir.), Known Unknowns of Translation Studies, Amsterdam, John Benjamins, 2014, p. 155-171
- Sherry Simon. "Afficher la langue dans l’art public", in Marc-André Brouillette (dir.), Des textes dans l’espace public / Words in Public Space, Montréal, Éditions du Passage, 2014, p. 68-77 and 143-146.
- Sherry Simon. Villes en traduction: Calcutta, Trieste, Barcelone et Montréal, Montréal, Presses de l’Université de Montréal, 2013.Sherry Simon (dir.). Speaking Memory. How Translation Shapes City Life, Montréal, McGill-Queen͛s University Press, 2016.
- Sherry Simon. Cities in Translation: Intersections of Language and Memory, New York, Routledge, 2011.Sherry Simon. Translation sites: A Field Guide. Routledge. 2019.
