= Translation Studies (journal) =

- Discipline: Translation studies
- Language: English
- Edited by: Piotr Blumczyński

Publication details
- History: 2008–present
- Publisher: Routledge
- Frequency: Triannually
- Impact factor: 0.947 (2019)

Standard abbreviations
- ISO 4: Transl. Stud.

Indexing
- ISSN: 1478-1700 (print); 1751-2921 (web)
- OCLC no.: 232605847

Links
- Journal homepage; Online access; Online archive

Translation Studies is a triannual peer-reviewed academic journal covering translation studies. It was established in 2008 and is published by Routledge. The editor-in-chief is Piotr Blumczyński (Queen's University Belfast).

== Abstracting and indexing ==
The journal is abstracted and indexed in:

- Arts & Humanities Citation Index
- Current Contents/Social & Behavioral Sciences
- Current Contents/Arts & Humanities
- EBSCO databases
- Linguistic Abstracts Online
- MLA International Bibliography
- Social Sciences Citation Index

According to the Journal Citation Reports, the journal has a 2019 impact factor of 0.947.
