= Klaus Berger (theologian) =

German academic theologian (1940–2020)

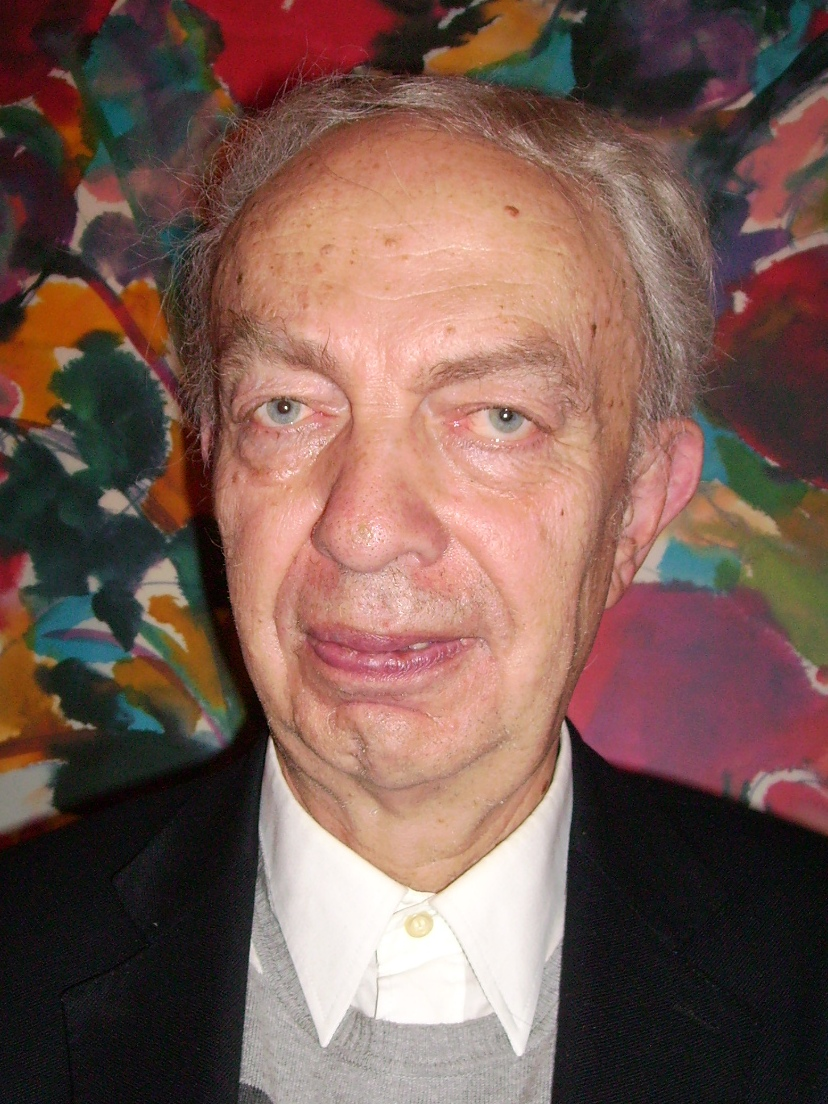
- Born: 25 November 1940; Hildesheim, Germany
- Died: 8 June 2020 (aged 79); Heidelberg, Germany

Academic background
- Education: LMU Munich; Humboldt University of Berlin; University of Hamburg

Academic work
- Discipline: Theology
- Sub-discipline: New Testament studies
- Institutions: Heidelberg University

Klaus Berger (25 November 1940 – 8 June 2020) was a German academic theologian. Berger was Professor of New Testament Theology at the University of Heidelberg.

== Biography ==
He is known for his study and publications on the New Testament. He had been quoted in several Catholic news sources to the effect that he was Catholic or somehow "both Catholic and Protestant." This idea was rejected by the Catholic Church and, after this controversy, he left the Protestant Church in Baden and became a member once more of the Catholic Church (in the diocese of Hildesheim, Germany).

== Personal life ==
Berger had two children from his first marriage with Christa Berger. Later he married translation scholar Christiane Nord. He was a familiaris of the Cistercian Abbey of Heiligenkreuz in the Vienna Woods.

== Selected works ==
=== Books ===
- Berger, Klaus (1995). The Truth under Lock and Key? Jesus and the Dead Sea Scrolls. Louisville, KY: Westminster John Knox Press. ISBN 9780664255473. OCLC 31170693.
- ——— (2003). Identity and Experience in the New Testament (trans. of Historische Psychologie des Neuen Testaments). Minneapolis, MN: Fortress Press. ISBN 9780800627799. OCLC 50912530. - pub. in German by Verl. Kath. Bibelwerk, 1995

=== Edited by ===
- ———; Boring, M. Eugene; Colpe, Carsten, eds. (1995). Hellenistic Commentary to the New Testament. Biblical Studies/New Testament. Nashville: Abingdon Press. ISBN 9780687009169. OCLC 644650888.
