= Dutch Crossing =

Academic journal about the low countries

- Discipline: Dutch culture and language
- Language: English
- Edited by: Carol Fehringer, Jane Fenoulhet, Amy Golahny, Theo Hermans, Ulrich Tiedau

Publication details
- History: 1977-present
- Publisher: Maney Publishing (United Kingdom)
- Frequency: Triannual

Standard abbreviations
- ISO 4: Dutch Crossing

Indexing
- CODEN: DUCRE2
- ISSN: 0309-6564 (print); 1759-7854 (web)
- OCLC no.: 643038376

Links
- Journal homepage; Online access; Journal page at University College London website

Dutch Crossing is an interdisciplinary peer-reviewed academic journal devoted to all aspects of Low Countries studies: history and art history, Dutch and Flemish (and occasionally Afrikaans) literary and cultural studies, Dutch language, Dutch as a foreign language, and intercultural and transnational studies. Its stated purpose is to cover "all aspects of 'Global Dutch', not only the Netherlands and the Dutch-speaking part of Belgium but also other places where Dutch historically had or continues to have an impact, including parts of the Americas, Southern Africa, and South-East Asia." A special focus concerns exchanges between the Low Countries and the English-speaking world in all periods from the late Middle Ages to the present day. Dutch Crossing is the official journal of the Association for Low Countries Studies."

== History ==
Since 1977 the journal has been edited at the Department of Dutch, first at Bedford College, Regent's Park, then since 1983 at University College London. From modest beginnings as a departmental magazine it developed into one of the main English language journals of interdisciplinary Low Countries studies, and in 1997 it became the journal of the Association for Low Countries Studies. In the 2009 Journal Awards of the Council of Editors of Learned Journals, Dutch Crossing received an honourable mention in the Phoenix Award for Significant Editorial Achievement. The journal is published by Maney Publishing and appears three times per year.

== Name ==
The name 'Dutch Crossing' reflects the journal's focus on exchanges between the Low Countries and the Anglophone world, although the term, like many similar English expressions with 'Dutch' from the 17th century when the two countries were frequently at war, was originally meant pejoratively.

== Abstracting and indexing ==
Dutch Crossing is abstracted in the ISI Web of Science databases and included in the initial lists for history and linguistics of the European Reference Index for the Humanities (ERIH) by the European Science Foundation (ESF). It is also abstracted and indexed in:

- Arts and Humanities Citation Index
- British Humanities Index
- EBSCO databases
- MLA databases
- Periodicals Index Online
- International Bibliography of Art
- Bibliography of the History of Art
- Bibliografie van de Nederlandse Taal- en Literatuurwetenschap
- Social Sciences Citation Index
- Current Contents/Arts and Humanities
