= Katharina Reiss =

German linguist and translator (1923–2018)

- Born: 17 April 1923; Rheinhausen, Germany
- Died: 16 April 2018 (aged 94); Munich, Germany
- Occupations: Linguist, translation scholar
- Known for: Skopos theory

Academic work
- Discipline: Translation studies
- Notable students: Christiane Nord

Katharina Reiss (17 April 1923 – 16 April 2018) was a German linguist and translation scholar.

Her works are important in the field of translation studies. She is widely seen as a co-founder of the Skopos theory.

== Life ==
Katharina Reiss was born in Rheinhausen, a small town on the left bank of the Rhine, and across the river from Duisburg into which, for administrative purposes, it has subsequently been subsumed. She passed her school finals exam ("Abitur" - loosely translated in English language sources as "diploma") in 1940 and went on to study between 1941 and 1944 at the Institute of Simultaneous Translation ("Dolmetscher-Institut") of Heidelberg University, where she received her first degree as a "professional translator". She taught at the institute's Spanish department between 1944 and 1970. She combined her teaching work, between 1951 and 1954, with the study of Philology, receiving her doctorate in 1954 for a piece of work on the Spanish author-journalist Leopoldo Alas (also known as "Clarin").

Between 1965 and 1970 she headed up the institute's Spanish department before transferring to Würzburg where in 1971 she took up the post of Academic Director at the Romance Languages Seminar. Reiss received her habilitation (higher academic qualification) from the University of Mainz for her research and development work involving so-called "Operative text types" ("zum operativen Texttyp"). A year later she accepted a teaching contract on translation studies at the university's Germersheim campus, close to the border with Alsace. By this time she had been speaking on her translation studies speciality at academic conferences and similar events at various universities in Germany since at least as far back as 1967. Later, during the Winter term of 1994/95 Reiss served as a guest professor at Vienna, presenting a lecture series for translation and simultaneous interpretation training.

Katharina Reiss died on 16 April 2018, one day before her 95th birthday. Her former student Christiane Nord contributed an appreciation in which she described Reiss as "a strict but fair teacher with a very subtle sense of humour".

== Work ==
With almost 90 publications and lectures in more than 20 countries Katharina Reiss can be seen as one of the leading contemporary scholars of Translation science. She is widely identified as the co-founder, with Hans Vermeer, of the so-called Skopos theory of translation.

In order to establish a standard terminological structure for Translation Sciences, in her habilitation dissertation she proposed classifying each text for translation ("The Operative Text") into one of four text types. Extrapolating from Karl Bühler's Organon model, the texts should be differentiated according to their respective functions, which she defines as "informative", "expressive" or "operative". She proposes a fourth type: "audio-medial", which covers texts that communicate using not just language, but also some other communications method such as acoustic or graphic or other technical.

== Output (selection) ==
- Möglichkeiten und Grenzen der Übersetzungskritik: Kategorien und Kriteren für eine sachgerechte Beurteilung von Übersetzungen. Munich, Hueber, 1971. Translated into English by Erroll. F. Rhodes as Translation Criticism: The Potentials and Limitations. Categories and Criteria for Translation Quality Assessment. St. Jerome Publishing Ltd, 2000.
- (with Hans Vermeer) Grundlegung einer allgemeinen Translationstheorie. Tübingen, Niemeyer, 1984.

== Bibliography ==
- Holz-Mänttäri, Justa: Textdesign -- verantwortlich und gehirngerecht. In: Holz-Mänttäri, Justa/Nord, Christiane, eds.: Traducere Navem. Festschrift für Katharina Reiß zum 70. Geburtstag. Tampereen yliopisto, Tampere 1993, pages 301-320. ISBN 951-44-3262-2.
