= Legal translation =

Translated text within the field of law

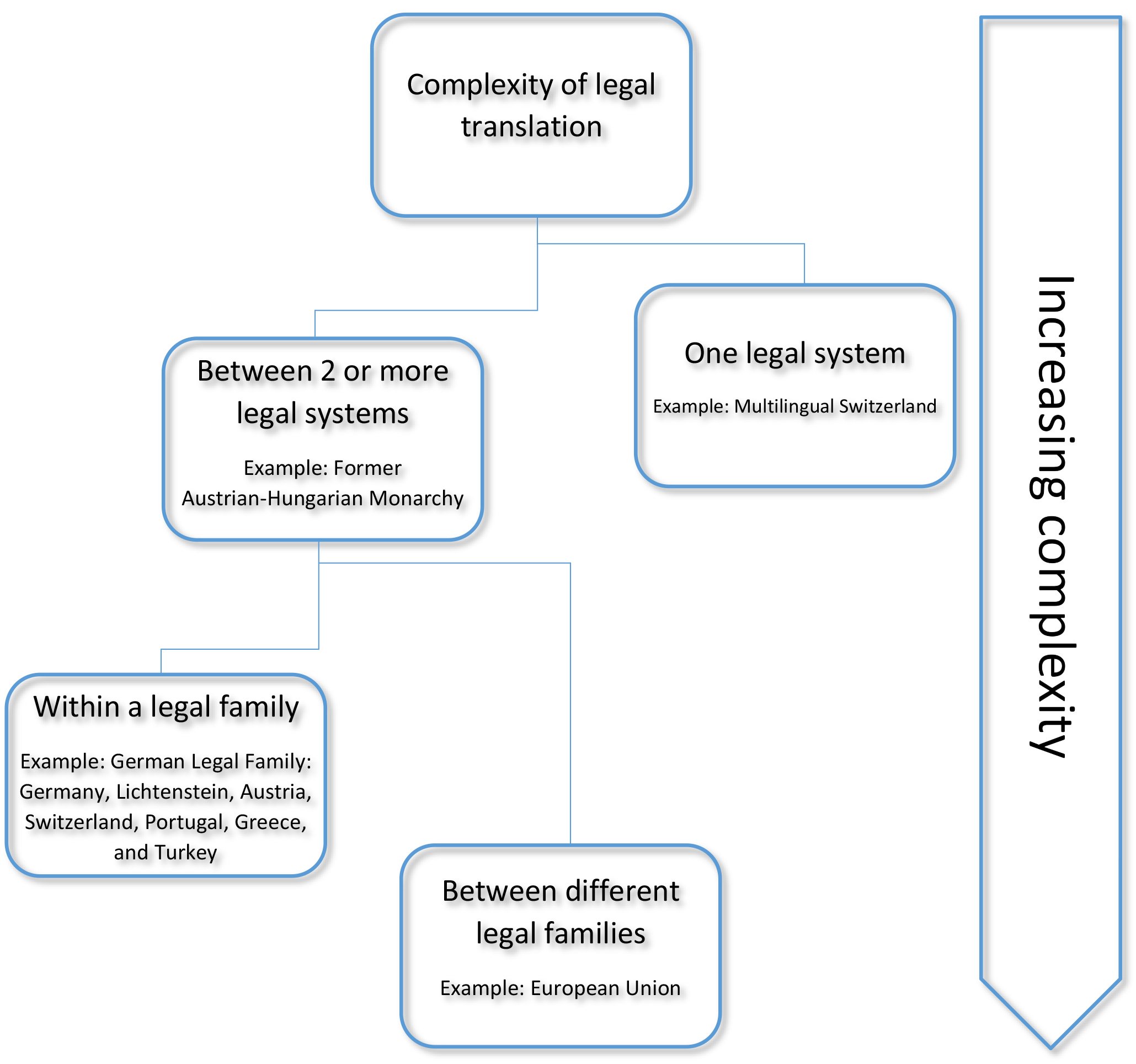
Complexity of legal translation

Legal translation is the translation of language used in legal settings and for legal purposes. Legal translation may also imply that it is a specific type of translation only used in law, which is not always the case. As law is a culture-dependent subject field, legal translation is not necessarily linguistically transparent. Intransparency in translation can be avoided somewhat by use of Latin legal terminology, where possible, but in non-western languages debates are centered on the origins and precedents of specific terms, such as in the use of particular Chinese characters in Japanese legal discussions.

Intransparency can lead to expensive misunderstandings in terms of a contract, for example, resulting in avoidable lawsuits. Legal translation is thus usually done by specialized law translators. Conflicts over the legal impact of a translation can be avoided by indicating that the text is "authentic" i.e. legally operative on its own terms or instead is merely a "convenience translation", which itself is not legally operative. Courts only apply authentic texts and do not rely on "convenience" translations in adjudicating rights and duties of litigants.

== Source text and target text ==
Most legal writing is exact and technical, seeking to precisely define legally binding rights and duties. Thus, precise correspondence of these rights and duties in the source text and in the translation is essential. As well as understanding and precisely translating the legal rights and duties established in the translated text, legal translators must also bear in mind the legal system of the source text (ST) and the legal system of the target text (TT) which may differ greatly from each other. This is a challenge because it requires that the translator have substantial legal knowledge as well as the multiple legal systems that can exist in one language. Examples of different legal systems include Anglo-American common law, Islamic law, or customary tribal law for examples.

Apart from terminological lacunae (lexical gaps), textual conventions in the source language are often culture-dependent and may not correspond to conventions in the target culture (see e.g. Nielsen 2010). Linguistic structures that are often found in the source language may have no direct equivalent structures in the target language. The translator therefore has to be guided by certain standards of linguistic, social and cultural equivalence between the language used in the source text (ST) to produce a text (TT) in the target language. Those standards correspond to a variety of different principles defined as different approaches to translation in translation theory. Each of the standards sets a certain priority among the elements of ST to be preserved in TT. For example, following the functional approach, translators try to find target language structures with the same functions as those in the source language thus value the functionality of a text fragment in ST more than, say, the meanings of specific words in ST and the order in which they appear there.

== Translation issues ==
The usage of transcription in the context of linguistic discussions has been controversial. Typically, two kinds of linguistic records are considered to be scientifically relevant. First, linguistic records of general acoustic features, and secondly, records that only focuses on the distinctive phonemes of a language. While transcriptions are not entirely illegitimate, transcriptions without enough detailed commentary regarding any linguistic features used has a great chance of the content being misinterpreted. An example that highlights this complication with transcription is displaying dialect in writing. The fundamental problem with this situation is that the transcribed product is not simply a spoken language in its written form, but a language the transcriber is responsible for writing down and a language that has been transcribed by someone other than the speaker, no matter the level of understanding the transcriber has for the spoken language. Any transcription is an interpretation of the speech no matter how detailed it is, and will be selective in what it includes or leave out. Because of this reason, it is important to strategically choose the form of transcription in order to properly represent the spoken language in a written form.

Different approaches to translation should not be confused with different approaches to translation theory. The former are the standards used by translators in their trade while the latter are just different paradigms used in developing translation theory. Few jurists are familiar with terms of translation theory. They may ask interpreters and translators to provide verbatim translation. They often view this term as a clear standard of quality that they desire in TT. However, verbatim translation usually is undesirable due to different grammar structures as well as different legal terms or rules in different legal systems. When it comes to translating, it can be difficult to find the correct words to translate the same information given because not all words that are translated can have the same meaning. There are many cultures around the world that the legal translation has to be exact. It is important that Legal Translators be able to interpret one word from a given language to another while still being able to maintain the same impact and meaning of the legal word.

== Bilingual law dictionaries ==
Legal translators often consult specialized bilingual or polyglot law dictionaries. Care should be taken, as some bilingual law dictionaries are of poor quality and their use may lead to mistranslation. Bilingual legal dictionaries tend to largely be a source of reference for interpretation, rather than a source of literal equivalent translations of legal terminology. Translating legal text from one language to another becomes a challenge for legal experts because there is a level of freedom to translating texts that retain meaning and not necessarily maintaining equivalent semantic structure. There is also a debate between experts to either restrict the legal language to the target text for professional use or to broaden legal language for the use and comprehension of the public, specifically in societies with bilingual law system.

== See also ==
- Indeterminacy of translation
- Skopos theory
- Translating "law" to other European languages
- Translating for legal equivalence

== Relevant literature ==
- Anabel Borja Albi & Fernando Prieto Ramos. Legal Translation in Context: Professional Issues and Prospects. Peter Lang, 2013.
- Mansour Amini, Shuangjiao Wu, & Qiufen Wang, eds. Exploring complexity in legal translation and discourse analysis. Hershey: GI Global Scientific Publishing, 2026.
- Beuvant, Hugo; Carvalho, Thérence; Lemée, Mathilde (2018). Les traductions du discours juridique. Perspectives historiques. Presses Universitaires de Rennes. ISBN 978-2-7535-6511-1.
- Cao, Deborah. Translating Law. Clevedon: Multilingual Matters, 2007.
- Downing, Bruce T.; Bogoslaw, Laurence H. (February 25, 2003). "Effective Patient-Provider Communication Across Language Barriers: A Focus on Methods of Translation". Archived from the original on October 9, 2010.
- El-Farahaty, Hanem. Arabic-English-Arabic legal translation. Abingdon: Routledge, 2015.
- Elmiger, Daniel (February 2013). "Translating international gender-equality institutional/legal texts: The example of 'gender' in Spanish". Gender and Language. 7 (1): 75–96. doi:10.1558/genl.v7i1.75.
- Garzone, Giuliana (2000). "Legal translation and functionalist approaches: a contradiction in terms?" (PDF). University of Bologna. Archived from the original (PDF) on 2003-12-11.
- Ghadi, Alireza Sadeghi. "All New Theories And Concepts About Translation In New Century".
- Halimi, Sonia & Djamel Goui, eds. Issues in Arabic Legal Translation: New Insights into the Field. Newcastle upon Tyne: Cambridge Scholars Publishing, 2025.
- Hjort-Pedersen, Mett; Faber, Dorrit (2001). "Lexical ambiguity and legal translation: a discussion". Multilingua. 20 (4): 379–392. doi:10.1515/mult.2001.008.
- Houbert, Frédéric. Guide pratique de la traduction juridique: anglais - français. Maison du Dictionnaire, 2005.
- Nielsen, Sandro (1994). The bilingual LSP dictionary. Principles and practice for legal language. Gunter Narr Verlag. ISBN 978-3-8233-4533-6.
- Nielsen, Sandro (2010). "Translational Creativity: Translating Genre Conventions in Statutes". Vertimo Studijos. 3 (3): 23–35. doi:10.15388/VertStud.2010.3.10586.
- Šarčević, Susan (2000). "Legal translation and translation theory: a receiver-oriented approach" (PDF). University of Rijeka. Archived from the original (PDF) on 2003-10-10.
