= Andrew Chesterman =

British translatologist

- Born: 1946 (age 79–80); London, UK

Academic background
- Education: University of Edinburgh (MA); University of Reading (PhD)

Academic work
- Discipline: Translation studies
- Institutions: University of Helsinki; University of Vienna

Andrew Peter Clement Chesterman (born 1946) is an English scholar based in Finland. He is best known for his work in Translation Studies and was Professor of Multilingual Communication at the University of Helsinki from 2002 to 2010. Chesterman was CETRA Professor in 1999 (Catholic University of Leuven), a member of the executive board of the European Society for Translation Studies (EST) from 1998 to 2004, and a member of the Scientific Advisory Board of the Center of Translation Studies (University of Vienna) from 2007 to 2010. He has been a member of the Finnish Society of Sciences and Letters since 2005 and a Knight, First Class, of the Order of the White Rose of Finland since 2008.

== Career ==
Chesterman studied Modern Languages at Selwyn College, Cambridge. Afterwards he studied Applied Linguistics at the University of Edinburgh, obtaining a Master of Letters in 1973, and obtained his PhD in linguistics from the University of Reading in 1988. In 1968, Chesterman moved to Finland and has been there ever since. He was mainly based at the University of Helsinki. In 2010, he retired from his professorship in Multilingual Communication at the University of Helsinki but is still active in Translation Studies.

== Works ==
- On Definiteness. A Study with Special Reference to English and Finnish, Cambridge: Cambridge University Press, 1991.
- Memes of Translation. The spread of ideas in translation theory, Amsterdam and Philadelphia: John Benjamins, 1997.
- Contrastive Functional Analysis, Amsterdam and Philadelphia: John Benjamins, 1998.
- Can Theory Help Translators?: A Dialogue Between the Ivory Tower and the Wordface, with Emma Wagner. Manchester: St Jerome Publishing, 2002.
- The Map. A Beginners' Guide to Doing Research in Translation Studies, with Jenny Williams. Manchester: St Jerome Publishing, 2002.
