= Itamar Even-Zohar =

Israeli sociologist and linguist

- איתמר אבן-זהר
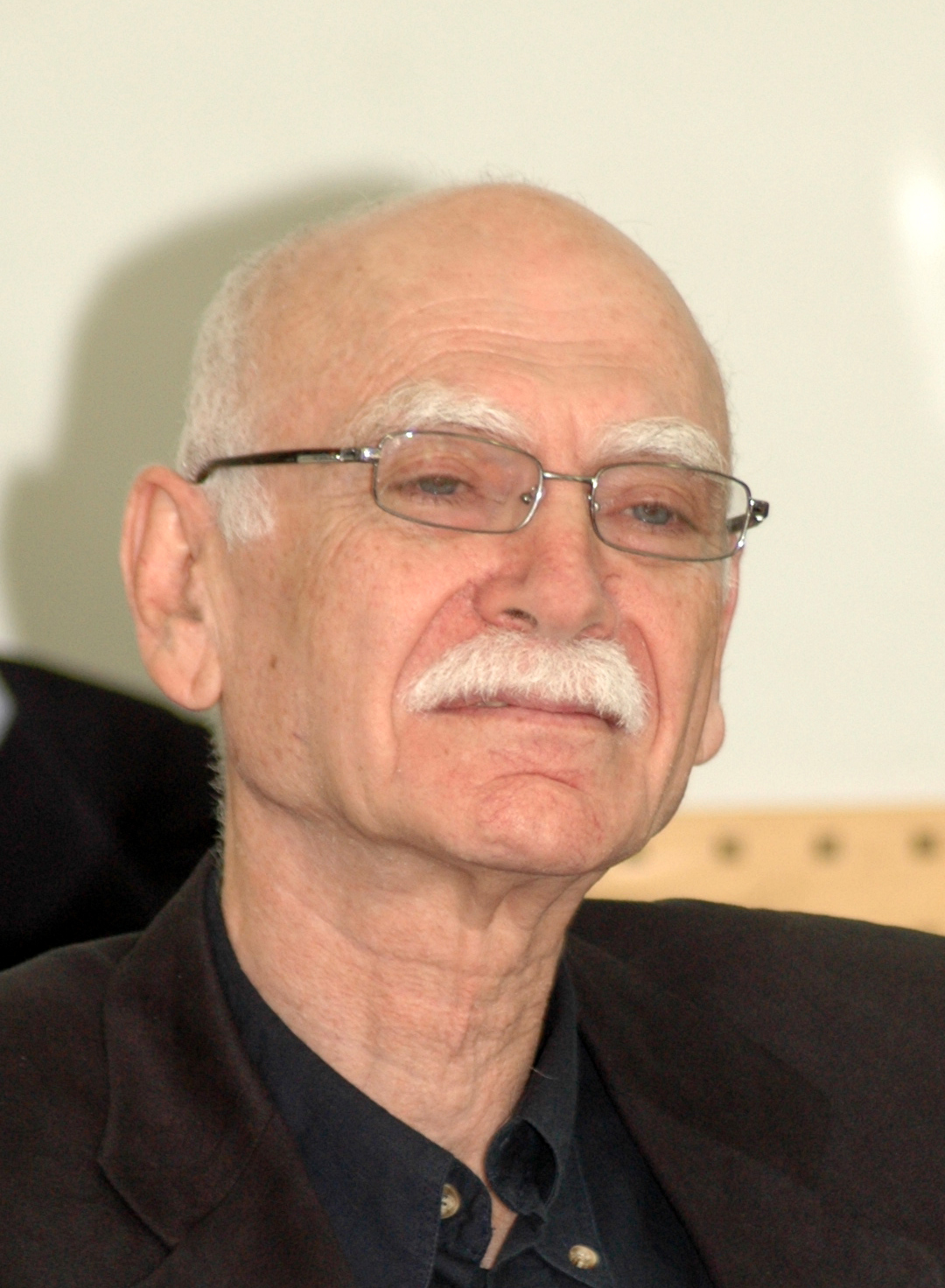
- Born: 1939 (age 86–87); Tel Aviv, Israel
- Known for: Polysystem theory

Academic background
- Education: Tel Aviv University (BA, PhD), Hebrew University of Jerusalem (MA)
- Thesis: An Introduction to the Theory of Literary Translation (1972)

Academic work
- Discipline: Translation Studies
- Doctoral students: Gideon Toury

Itamar Even-Zohar (Hebrew: איתמר אבן-זהר; born 1939) is an Israeli culture researcher and professor at Tel Aviv University. Even-Zohar is a pioneer of polysystem theory and the theory of cultural repertoires.

== Biography ==
Itamar Even-Zohar was born in Tel Aviv. He earned his degrees from the University of Tel Aviv (B.A., and PhD) and the Hebrew University of Jerusalem (M.A). He also studied in Oslo, Copenhagen and Stockholm. He has been a guest scholar at universities and research centers in Amsterdam, Paris, Philadelphia, Reykjavík, Quebec City, Louvain, Santiago de Compostela, Santander, St. John's (Newfoundland), Barcelona and Santa Cruz, California. He has a working knowledge of Hebrew (mother tongue), Arabic, English, French, Swedish, Spanish, Norwegian, Danish, Italian, Russian, German, Icelandic, and other languages. In April 2014 he was elected Honorary Member of the Austrian Academy of Sciences, Division of Humanities and the Social Sciences.

== Thought and teaching ==
=== Structuralist research ===
Since the early 1970s Even-Zohar has been working on developing theoretical tools and research methodology for dealing with the complexity and interdependency of socio-cultural ‘systems,’ which he views as heterogeneous, versatile and dynamic networks. In 1972, he proposed a multi-layered structural theory of text (Even-Zohar 1972), but soon became one of the first critics of “Static Structuralism” (Even-Zohar 1978) and what he saw as a reification flaw imposed on the Structuralist agenda by a rigid and ‘sterile’ interpretation of Saussure’s notions of structure and ‘linguistic system’. In order for these notions to be widely and fruitfully applicable to all living, complex cultural activities, he believes one must take into account the interplay of the diachronic (historical) and synchronic (contemporary) dimensions of a socio-cultural system". He therefore introduced the idea of “dynamic Structuralism,” with the concept of an ”open system of systems,” to capture the aspects of variability and heterogeneity in time and place (Even-Zohar 1979).

Using this new approach, he constructed a research program that dealt with literary systems rather than texts, which in the 1980s and early 1990s was considered a breakthrough in literary studies and laid the ground for new schools in literary and translation studies (e.g., the Tel Aviv School, the Leuven School). It allowed researchers to break away from the normative notion of “literature” and “culture” as limited sets of highbrow products and explore a multi-layered interplay between “center” and “periphery”, and “canonized” and “non-canonized.” Even-Zohar has also studied linguistic diglossia and the interrelationship of literary systems.

=== Polysystem theory ===
Even-Zohar substitutes univalent causal parameters with polyvalent factors as an instrument for explaining the complexity of culture within a single community and between communities. His "polysystem theory" (Even-Zohar 1978, 1979, 1990, 1997, 2005 [electronic book]) analyzed sets of relations in literature and language, but gradually shifted towards a more complex analysis of socio-cultural systems. Even-Zohar's polysystem theory has been embraced by students of literature and culture all over the world. The theory has proven particularly relevant in Spain and China. (Iglesias 1999; Chung Wai Literary Monthly, Vol. 30, No. 3, August 2001). Another advocate of this theory is American scholar Edwin Gentzler.

=== The concept of ‘Models’ ===
Even-Zohar took the basic idea of ‘system’ a step further in proposing that the object of study was no longer texts and products but rather dynamic cultural models that determine the production of concrete cultural objects (Even-Zohar 1997). Developing his theories in cognitive science and anthropology, he maintained that it is the inter-personal models which people acquire and employ in their day to day conduct as members of a community that help to explain the dynamics of a certain culture. The theory of models is part of Even-Zohar's larger Theory of Repertoire, both deeply inspired by Russian Formalism and the Soviet semiotics (Juri Lotman, Vyacheslav Ivanov, Vladimir Toporov, Boris Uspensky, and others).

=== Translation studies ===
Even Zohar's analysis of norms in translation have shown that discrepancies between the source and the target texts can be explained as the result of actions governed by domestic norms. Even-Zohar's systemic approach has transformed Translation studies from a marginal philological specialty to a focus of inter-culture research. His article, “The Position of Translated Literature”, is widely quoted. His polysystem theory has opened many avenues to researchers in translation studies. (Susan Bassnett, 1993: 142). In Even-Zohar's terms, a ‘polysystem’ is multidimensional and able to accommodate taxonomies established in the realm of literature (the division between high and low literature), translation (the division between translation and non translation) and social relationships (the division between dominant and dominated social groups). (Lianeri 2001).

=== Nation-building through culture ===
Even-Zohar has studied the role of literature in the construction of national cultures and published comparative analyses of Hebrew, Italian, Norwegian, Galician, Catalan and Icelandic culture. Even-Zohar has proposed that ‘culture’ as an object of study should no longer be restricted to products, but include models for cultural actions. Culture is thus perceived as a life-management program, not just a set of elite commodities (Even-Zohar 1997, 2005). Even-Zohar's analysis of the emergence and crystallization of native Hebrew culture in Palestine is widely cited and used as a model for paradigmatic analysis of other emerging cultures.

Since the 1990s, Even-Zohar's research has focused on deliberate culture planning in the development of new socio-political entities. He has examined problems of majority and minority, and center and periphery in the context of accessing and controlling resources. Since the end of the 18th century a growing number of communities around the globe have adopted the model of self-management, often bundled together with enterprises to create separate culture repertoires. Even-Zohar began with the building of Hebrew culture in Palestine between 1882 and 1948, and then moved on to other societies. Since 1993, he has been carrying out research in situ in Spanish Galicia, Catalonia, Iceland, Québec, and Newfoundland.

=== Culture planning ===
Even-Zohar described culture planning as a deliberate act of intervention, whether by power holders or 'free agents'. The primary goal of culture planning is to gain control over the field. Translation, predominantly orchestrated by the State, holds significance in comprehending interventions in translation poetics within culture planning. Cultural transformation, according to Even-Zohar, is achieved through a decision-making process, constructing culture through both tangible elements like books and artworks, and intangible aspects such as behavioral norms. The translation repertoire comprises translated texts as material components, alongside translational norms and policies as intangible elements.

== Published works ==
- 1972. "An Outline of a Theory of the Literary Text." Ha-Sifrut III (3/4): pp. 427–446. <In Hebrew>
- 1978. Papers in Historical Poetics. Tel Aviv: Porter Institute.
- 1979. "Polysystem Theory." Poetics Today 1(1-2, Autumn) pp. 287–310.
- 1990. Polysystem Studies. Poetics Today 11:1 Durham: Duke University Press.
- 1994. "Avances en teoría de la literatura". USC Universidade de Santiago de Compostela (Dario Villanueva Prieto collector) ISBN 8481211516
- 1997. "Factors and Dependencies in Culture: A Revised Draft for Polysystem Culture Research." Canadian Review of Comparative Literature / Revue Canadienne de Littérature Comparée XXIV(1, March), pp. 15–34.
- 2005. Papers in Culture Research.
