= Anton Popovič =

- Born: 27 July 1933
- Died: 24 June 1984 (aged 50)

Academic work
- Discipline: Translation studies

Anton Popovič (27 July 1933 – 24 June 1984) was a fundamental Slovak translation scientist and text theoretician. He is recognized for his important contributions to the modern development of translation studies.

== Biography ==
Popovič was born in Prešov, a city in Eastern Slovakia. He studied Slovak and Russian languages and, in 1956, completed his PhD in what is now Moravia, Czech Republic.

He belonged to the school of Nitra, having been associated with the Department of Literary Communication in Nitra (Slovakia). When he arrived in the city in 1967, he collaborated with Frantisek Miko to establish the Centre for Literary Communication and Experimental Methodology, which aimed to develop a literary communication theory as well as a theory of literary translation.

== Works ==
Popovič was among the first to apply semiotic theory to the study of translation in his book Teória umeleckého prekladu [Theory of artistic translation], 1975. Considering translation a particular case of metacommunication, he proposed the terms "prototext" and "metatext" as alternatives to what are most commonly known as the "source text" and the "target text". He also coined the term "translationality" (prekladovosť), signifying the features of a text that denounce it as a translated text, and the term "creolization", meaning something in between a source culture text and a target culture text.

Popovič was one of the originators of the retrospective analysis, which involves the retrospective evaluation of typologies to present all terms as operating on one level. This method included the concept of "shifts" in translation, describing it as changes that occur in the process of transfer from one language to another. Popovič also defined liquistic equivalence as an instance "where there is homogeneity on the linguistic level of both source language and target language texts".

Popovič has explained his communication, literary, and translation theories in several published works, which include Literary translation in Czechoslovakia (1974), Theory of literary translation (1975), and the Original/Translation, Interpretational terminology (1984). His books have been translated into Italian, German and Russian.

== Sources ==
- Dimić, Milan V. (1984), "Anton Popovič in Memoriam", Canadian Review of Comparative Literature, 11 (2): 350.
- Baker, Mona; Saldanha, Gabriela (2008), Routledge Encyclopedia of Translation Studies, Routledge, p. 526, ISBN 978-0-415-36930-5.
- Beylard-Ozeroff, Ann; Králová, Jana; Moser-Mercer, Barbara, eds. (1998), Translators' Strategies and Creativity: Selected Papers from the 9th International Conference on Translation and Interpreting, Prague, September, 1995 : In honor of Jiří Levý and Anton Popovič, Benjamins Translation Library, vol. 27, ISBN 978-90-272-1630-4.
- Makaryk, Irene Rima (1993), Encyclopedia of contemporary literary theory: approaches, scholars, terms, University of Toronto Press, p. 131, ISBN 978-0-8020-6860-6.
- Anton Popovič, Bruno Osimo (2006), La scienza della traduzione. Aspetti metodologici. La comunicazione traduttiva, Hoepli, p. 214, ISBN 978-88-203-3511-3.
