= Aune Mänttäri =

Finnish politician

Aune Mänttäri (née Partanen; born 23 July 1936 in Kontiolahti) is a Finnish market gardener and politician. She was a member of the Parliament of Finland, representing the Finnish Rural Party (SMP) in 1972 and the Finnish People's Unity Party (SKYP) from 1972 to 1975.
