= Christiane Nord =

German translation scholar

- Nord in 2006
- Born: 13 September 1943 (age 83); Eberswalde, Germany
- Occupation: Translation scholar
- Partner: Klaus Berger

Academic background
- Education: Heidelberg University

Academic work
- Discipline: Translation studies
- Institutions: Heidelberg University, University of Vienna, University of Hildesheim, University of Innsbruck, and Otto von Guericke University Magdeburg

Christiane Nord (born 13 September 1943) is a German translation scholar.

== Biography ==
She studied translation at Heidelberg University (B.A. Honours, 1967); in 1983 she obtained her PhD in Romance Studies, with habilitation in applied translation studies and translation pedagogy. From 1967 she has been involved in translator training at the universities of Heidelberg, Vienna, Hildesheim, Innsbruck and Magdeburg (1996–2005).

She was married to theologian Klaus Berger, who died in 2020. They had worked together to translate sections of the Bible.

== Works ==
- "Textdesign - verantwortlich und gehirngerecht". In: Holz-Mänttäri, Justa/Nord, Christiane, eds.: Traducere Navem. Festschrift für Katharina Reiß zum 70. Geburtstag. Tampereen yliopisto, 1993, pages 301–320. ISBN 951-44-3262-2.
- Translating as a Purposeful Activity. Functionalist Approaches Explained. 1997.
- Fertigkeit Übersetzen. Ein Kurs zum Übersetzenlehren und -lernen. Berlin: BDÜ Service Verlag (Schriftenreihe des BDÜ 38) (2nd edition of Nord 2002).
- Kommunikativ handeln auf Spanisch und Deutsch. Ein übersetzungsorientierter funktionaler Sprach- und Stilvergleich, Wilhelmsfeld: Gottfried Egert Verlag, 2003.
- Text Analysis in Translation: Theory, Methodology and Didactic Application of a Model for Translation-Oriented Text Analysis, Amsterdam-New York: Rodopi, 2nd. revised edition, 2005.
- Kommunikativ handeln auf Spanisch und Deutsch: ein übersetzungsorientierter funktionaler Sprach- und Stilvergleich. Egert, Wilhelmsfeld 2003, ISBN 3-926972-99-8
