= Dutch Courage =

Live album by Poison Idea
- Released: 1991
- Genre: Hardcore punk
- Label: Blitzcore

Poison Idea chronology
Punish Me (1991)	Dutch Courage (1991)	Official Bootleg (1991)

Dutch Courage is a live album by American hardcore punk band Poison Idea. It was released in 1991 on Blitzcore.

== Track listing ==
1. Plastic Bomb
2. Just to Get Away
3. Getting the Fear
4. Painkiller
5. Hangover Heartattack
6. Time to Go
7. Cop an Attitude
8. Feel the Darkness
9. Give It Up
10. Taken by Surprise
11. A.A
12. Alan's on Fire
13. Marked for Life
14. We Got It
15. Kick Out
16. Short Fuse
17. A.A.
18. Give It Up
19. The Badge
