= Alexander Lyudskanov =

Bulgarian translator, semiotician and mathematician

Aleksandăr Lûdskanov (family name sometimes also transliterated as Lyutskanov) (Bulgarian: Александър Люцканов) (Sofia, 21 April 1926 – 1976) was a Bulgarian translator, semiotician, mathematician, and expert on machine translation. Ludskanov's work focused on linking translation and semiotics by defining the key component of translation as semiotic transfer, which he defined as replacing the signs that encode a message with signs from another code while doing the utmost to maintain "invariant information with respect to a given system of reference." In 1975, Ludskanov published an article called "A semiotic approach to the theory of translation" that argued that semiotics "does not provide the concept of semiotic transformation, though such transformations certainly exist."
