= Justa Holz-Mänttäri =

German-born Finnish translation scholar (born 1936)

- Born: 1936 (age 89–90)
- Known for: Translatorial action

Academic work
- Discipline: Translation studies

Justa Holz-Mänttäri (born 1936) is a German-born Finnish translation scholar.

She developed the Theory of Translatorial Action and the concept of "message carrier".

== Works ==
- Translatorisches Handeln. Theorie und Methode. Annales Academiae Scientarum Fennicae. Ser. B 226. Helsinki: Suomalainen Tiedeakatemia, 1984. ISBN 951-41-0491-9.
- "Textdesign - verantwortlich und gehirngerecht". In: Holz-Mänttäri, Justa/Nord, Christiane, eds.: Traducere Navem. Festschrift für Katharina Reiß zum 70. Geburtstag. Tampereen yliopisto, Tampere 1993, pages 301–320. ISBN 951-44-3262-2.
- "Evolutionäre Translationstheorie". In: Rupert Riedl and Manuela Delpos, eds. Die Evolutionäre Erkenntnistheorie im Spiegel del Wissenschaften. Vienna: Wiener Universitätsverlag, 1996, reprinted in 2001 in TEXTconTEXT 15:2. 245–281.
