= Polysystem theory =

Translation studies theory

The polysystem theory, a theory in translation studies, implies using polyvalent factors as an instrument for explaining the complexity of culture within a single community and between communities. Analyzing sets of relations in literature and language, it gradually shifted towards a more complex analysis of socio-cultural systems.

The polysystem theory has been embraced by students of literature and culture all over the world, and has particularly gained attention in the field of Scandinavian studies.

Its foremost advocate is the Israeli linguist Itamar Even-Zohar. The American scholar Edwin Gentzler is another important contributor to this viewpoint.
