= Susan Bassnett =

British academic (b. 1945)

- Born: 21 October 1945 (age 80)
- Partner: Clive Barker

Academic work
- Discipline: Translation studies Comparative literature
- Institutions: University of Warwick; University of Glasgow

Susan Edna Bassnett, FRSL (born 21 October 1945) is a translation theorist and scholar of comparative literature. She served as pro-vice-chancellor at the University of Warwick for ten years and taught in its Centre for Translation and Comparative Cultural Studies, which closed in 2009. As of 2016, she is Professor of Comparative Literature at the Universities of Glasgow and Warwick. Educated around Europe, she began her career in Italy and has lectured at universities in the United States. In 2007, she was elected a fellow of the Royal Society of Literature.

== Early life and education ==
Bassnett was born on 21 October 1945. She studied English and Italian at the University of Manchester, graduating with a first class honours Bachelor of Arts (BA) degree in 1968. She studied for a Doctor of Philosophy (PhD) degree in French at the University of Lancaster, which she completed in 1975.

== Academic career ==
Bassnett began her academic career as a lecturer at the University of Rome from 1968 to 1972. She then returned to England as a lecturer at the University of Lancaster from 1972 to 1976. She joined the University of Warwick as a lecturer in 1976, and established its Centre for Translation and Comparative Cultural Studies in 1985. She was promoted to reader in 1989, and appointed Professor of Comparative Literature in 1992. She twice served as the university's pro-vice-chancellor, from 1997 to 2003 and from 2005 to 2009. She retired from Warwick in 2016 and was made professor emerita. In retirement, she has held the appointment of Professor of Comparative Literature at the University of Glasgow since 2015.

== Notable works ==
Among her more than twenty books, several have become mainstays in the field of literary criticism, especially Translation Studies (1980) and Comparative Literature (1993). A book on Ted Hughes was published in 2009. Another book edited by Bassnett is Knives and Angels: Women Writers in Latin America. Bassnett's collaboration with several intellectuals in a series of book projects has been received well. In 2006, she co-edited with Peter Bush the book The Translator as Writer. In addition to her scholarly works, Bassnett writes poetry which was published as Exchanging Lives: Poems and Translations (2002).

== Critical ideas ==
=== Foregrounding translation ===
In her 1998 work Constructing Cultures: Essays on Literary Translation (written with André Lefevere), Bassnett states that "the shift of emphasis from original to translation is reflected in discussions on the visibility of the translator. Lawrence Venuti calls for a translator-centered translation, insisting that the translator should inscribe him/herself visibly into the text".

=== Comparative literature as a literary strategy ===
In a 2006 essay titled Reflections on Comparative Literature in the Twenty-First Century, she engaged with Gayatri Chakravorty Spivak who argues in Death of a Discipline (2003) that the field of comparative literature must move beyond its eurocentrism if it is to stay relevant. While she agrees with Spivak that eurocentrism has marginalised literatures from the non-West, she also argues that Spivak's argument puts comparatists from Europe, who are familiar with its literatures, in a precarious position. To Bassnett, the way out for European comparatists is to critically investigate their past. Bassnett also recanted her previous stance that comparative literature is a dying subject that will slowly be replaced by translation studies. Rather, she argues that comparative literature and translation theory continue to be relevant today if taken as modes of reading that literary critics can use to approach texts.

== Personal life ==
Clive Barker, Bassnett's long-term partner and a theatre studies academic at Warwick, died in 2005.
