= Domestication and foreignization =

Strategies in cultural translation

Domestication and foreignization are strategies in translation, regarding the degree to which translators make a text conform to the target culture (the culture corresponding to the language in which the translation is made). Domestication is the strategy of making text closely conform to the culture of the language being translated to, which may involve the loss of information from the source text. Foreignization is the strategy of retaining information from the source text, and involves deliberately breaking the conventions of the target language to preserve its meaning. These strategies have been debated for hundreds of years, but the first person to formulate them in their modern sense was Lawrence Venuti, who introduced them to the field of translation studies in 1995 with his book The Translator's Invisibility: A History of Translation. Venuti's innovation to the field was his view that the dichotomy between domestication and foreignization was an ideological one; he views foreignization as the ethical choice for translators to make.

== Theory ==
In his 1998 book The Scandals of Translation: Towards an Ethics of Difference, Venuti states that "Domestication and foreignization deal with 'the question of how much a translation assimilates a foreign text to the translating language and culture, and how much it rather signals the differences of that text'".

According to Lawrence Venuti, every translator should look at the translation process through the prism of culture which refracts the source language cultural norms and it is the translator’s task to convey them, preserving their meaning and their foreignness, to the target-language text. Every step in the translation process—from the selection of foreign texts to the implementation of translation strategies to the editing, reviewing, and reading of translations—is mediated by the diverse cultural values that circulate in the target language.

He estimates that the theory and practice of English-language translation had been dominated by submission, by fluent domestication. He criticized translators who, in order to minimize the foreignness of the target text, reduce foreign cultural norms to target-language cultural values. According to Venuti, the domesticating strategy “violently” erases cultural values and thus creates a text as if it had been written in the target language and which follows the cultural norms of the target reader. He strongly advocates the foreignization strategy, considering it to be “an ethnodeviant pressure on [target-language cultural] values to register the linguistic and cultural difference of the foreign text, sending the reader abroad.” Thus an adequate translation would be the one that highlighted the foreignness of the source text. Instead of allowing the dominant target culture to assimilate the differences of the source culture, it should rather signal these differences to the reader.

== See also ==
- Antoine Berman
- Friedrich Schleiermacher
- Language localization
