= Translation studies =

Study of translation as an academic discipline

Translation studies is an academic interdiscipline dealing with the systematic study of the theory, description and application of translation, interpreting, and localization. As an interdiscipline, translation studies borrows much from the various fields of study that support translation. These include comparative literature, computer science, history, linguistics, philology, philosophy, semiotics, and terminology.

The term “translation studies” was coined by the Amsterdam-based American scholar James S. Holmes in his 1972 paper “The name and nature of translation studies”, which is considered a foundational statement for the discipline. Writers in English occasionally use the term "translatology" (and less commonly "traductology") to refer to translation studies, and the corresponding French term for the discipline is usually traductologie (as in the Société Française de Traductologie). In the United States, there is a preference for the term "translation and interpreting studies" (as in the American Translation and Interpreting Studies Association), although European tradition includes interpreting within translation studies (as in the European Society for Translation Studies).

== History ==
=== Early studies ===
Historically, translation studies has long been "prescriptive" (telling translators how to translate), to the point that discussions of translation that were not prescriptive were generally not considered to be about translation at all. When historians of translation studies trace early Western thought about translation, for example, they most often set the beginning at the renowned orator Cicero's remarks on how he used translation from Greek to Latin to improve his oratorical abilities—an early description of what Jerome ended up calling sense-for-sense translation. The descriptive history of interpreters in Egypt provided by Herodotus several centuries earlier is typically not thought of as translation studies—presumably because it does not tell translators how to translate. In China, the discussion on how to translate originated with the translation of Buddhist sutras during the Han dynasty.

=== Calls for an academic discipline ===
In 1958, at the Fourth Congress of Slavists in Moscow, the debate between linguistic and literary approaches to translation reached a point where it was proposed that the best thing might be to have a separate science that was able to study all forms of translation, without being wholly within linguistics or wholly within literary studies. Within comparative literature, translation workshops were promoted in the 1960s in some American universities like the University of Iowa and Princeton.

During the 1950s and 1960s, systematic linguistic-oriented studies of translation began to appear. In 1958, the French linguists Jean-Paul Vinay and Jean Darbelnet carried out a contrastive comparison of French and English. In 1964, Eugene Nida published Toward a Science of Translating, a manual for Bible translation influenced to some extent by Harris's transformational grammar. In 1965, J. C. Catford theorized translation from a linguistic perspective. In the 1960s and early 1970s, the Czech scholar Jiří Levý and the Slovak scholars Anton Popovič and František Miko worked on the stylistics of literary translation.

These initial steps toward research on literary translation were collected in James S. Holmes' paper at the Third International Congress of Applied Linguistics held in Copenhagen in 1972. In that paper, "The name and nature of translation studies", Holmes asked for the consolidation of a separate discipline and proposed a classification of the field. A visual "map" of Holmes' proposal was later presented by Gideon Toury in his 1995 Descriptive Translation Studies and beyond.

Before the 1990s, translation scholars tended to form particular schools of thought, particularly within the prescriptive, descriptive and Skopos paradigms. Since the "cultural turn" in the 1990s, the discipline has tended to divide into separate fields of inquiry, where research projects run parallel to each other, borrowing methodologies from each other and from other academic disciplines.

== Schools of thought ==
The main schools of thought on the level of research have tended to cluster around key theoretical concepts, most of which have become objects of debate.

=== Equivalence ===
Through to the 1950s and 1960s, discussions in translation studies tended to concern how best to attain "equivalence". The term "equivalence" had two distinct meanings, corresponding to different schools of thought. In the Russian tradition, "equivalence" was usually a one-to-one correspondence between linguistic forms, or a pair of authorized technical terms or phrases, such that "equivalence" was opposed to a range of "substitutions". However, in the French tradition of Vinay and Darbelnet, drawing on Bally, "equivalence" was the attainment of equal functional value, generally requiring changes in form. Catford's notion of equivalence in 1965 was as in the French tradition. In the course of the 1970s, Russian theorists adopted the wider sense of "equivalence" as something resulting from linguistic transformations.

At about the same time, the Interpretive Theory of Translation introduced the notion of deverbalized sense into translation studies, drawing a distinction between word correspondences and sense equivalences, and showing the difference between dictionary definitions of words and phrases (word correspondences) and the sense of texts or fragments thereof in a given context (sense equivalences).

The discussions of equivalence accompanied typologies of translation solutions (also called "procedures", "techniques" or "strategies"), as in Fedorov (1953) and Vinay and Darbelnet (1958). In 1958, Loh Dianyang's Translation: Its Principles and Techniques (英汉翻译理论与技巧) drew on Fedorov and English linguistics to present a typology of translation solutions between Chinese and English.

In these traditions, discussions of the ways to attain equivalence have mostly been prescriptive and have been related to translator training.

=== Descriptive translation studies ===
Descriptive translation studies aims at building an empirical descriptive discipline, to fill one section of the Holmes map. The idea that scientific methodology could be applicable to cultural products had been developed by the Russian Formalists in the early years of the 20th century, and had been recovered by various researchers in comparative literature. It was now applied to literary translation. Part of this application was the theory of polysystems (Even-Zohar 1990) in which translated literature is seen as a sub-system of the receiving or target literary system. Gideon Toury bases his theory on the need to consider translations as "facts of the target culture" for the purposes of research. The concepts of "manipulation" and "patronage" have also been developed in relation to literary translations.

=== Skopos theory ===
Another discovery in translation theory can be dated from 1984 in Europe and the publication of two books in German: Foundation for a General Theory of Translation by Katharina Reiss (also written Reiß) and Hans Vermeer, and Translatorial Action (Translatorisches Handeln) by Justa Holz-Mänttäri. From these two came what is known as Skopos theory, which gives priority to the purpose to be fulfilled by the translation instead of prioritizing equivalence.

=== Cultural translation ===
The cultural turn meant still another step forward in the development of the discipline. It was sketched by Susan Bassnett and André Lefevere in Translation - History - Culture, and quickly represented by the exchanges between translation studies and other area studies and concepts: gender studies, cannibalism, post-colonialism or cultural studies, among others.

The concept of "cultural translation" largely ensues from Homi Bhabha's reading of Salman Rushdie in The Location of Culture. Cultural translation is a concept used in cultural studies to denote the process of transformation, linguistic or otherwise, in a given culture. The concept uses linguistic translation as a tool or metaphor in analyzing the nature of transformation and interchange in cultures.

== Fields of inquiry ==
=== Translation history ===
Translation history concerns the history of translators as a professional and social group, as well as the history of translations as indicators of the way cultures develop, interact and may die. Some principles for translation history have been proposed by Lieven D'hulst and Pym. Major projects in translation history have included the Oxford History of Literary Translation in English and Histoire des traductions en langue française.

Historical anthologies of translation theories have been compiled by Robinson (2002) for Western theories up to Nietzsche; by D'hulst (1990) for French theories, 1748–1847; by Santoyo (1987) for the Spanish tradition; by Edward Balcerzan (1977) for the Polish experience, 1440–1974; and by Cheung (2006) for Chinese.

=== Sociologies of translation ===
The sociology of translation includes the study of who translators are, what their forms of work are (workplace studies) and what data on translations can say about the movements of ideas between languages. Languages themselves can therefore be understood as actors in the transfer of translations. Sociology of translation is therefore related to Bourdieu's field theory, in which symbolic capital is transferred between actors. As Bachleitner and Wolf argue, the position of authors and translators in their respective fields based on their accumulated capital, significantly influences the literary transfer and circulation of translations. Hence, sociology of translation asks the following questions:

Eine Kernfrage der Übersetzungssoziologie lautet also: Welche AkteurInnen und welche Milieus der Zielkultur nehmen sich der übersetzerischen Vermittlung eines bestimmten Texts an? [...] Welche (sozioästhetischen, ideologischen) Interessen werden dadurch bedient?

=== Post-colonial translation studies ===
Post-colonial studies look at translations between a metropolis and former colonies, or within complex former colonies. They radically question the assumption that translation occurs between cultures and languages that are radically separated.

=== Gender studies ===
Gender studies look at the sexuality of translators, at the gendered nature of the texts they translate, at the possibly gendered translation processes employed, and at the gendered metaphors used to describe translation. Pioneering studies are by Luise von Flotow, Sherry Simon and Keith Harvey. The effacement or inability to efface threatening forms of same-sex sexuality is a topic taken up, when for instance ancient writers are translated by Renaissance thinkers in a Christian context.

=== Ethics ===
In the field of ethics, much-discussed publications have been the essays of Antoine Berman and Lawrence Venuti that differ in some aspects but agree on the idea of emphasizing the differences between source and target language and culture when translating. Both are interested in how the "cultural other [...] can best preserve [...] that otherness". In more recent studies, scholars have applied Emmanuel Levinas' philosophical work on ethics and subjectivity on this issue. As his publications have been interpreted in different ways, various conclusions on his concept of ethical responsibility have been drawn from this. Some have come to the assumption that the idea of translation itself could be ethically doubtful, while others receive it as a call for considering the relationship between author or text and translator as more interpersonal, thus making it an equal and reciprocal process.

Parallel to these studies, the general recognition of the translator's responsibility has increased. More and more translators and interpreters are being seen as active participants in geopolitical conflicts, which raises the question of how to act ethically independent from their own identity or judgement. This leads to the conclusion that translating and interpreting cannot be considered solely as a process of language transfer, but also as socially and politically directed activities.

There is general agreement on the need for an ethical code of practice providing some guiding principles to reduce uncertainties and improve professionalism, as having been stated in other disciplines (for example military medical ethics or legal ethics). However, as there is still no clear understanding of the concept of ethics in this field, opinions about the particular appearance of such a code vary considerably.

=== Audiovisual translation studies ===
Audiovisual translation studies (AVT) is concerned with translation that takes place in audio and/or visual settings, such as the cinema, television, video games and also some live events such as opera performances. The common denominator for studies in this field is that translation is carried out on multiple semiotic systems, as the translated texts (so-called polysemiotic texts) have messages that are conveyed through more than one semiotic channel, i.e. not just through the written or spoken word, but also via sound and/or images. The main translation modes under study are subtitling, film dubbing and voice-over, but also surtitling for the opera and theatre.

Media accessibility studies is often considered a part of this field as well, with audio description for the blind and partially sighted and subtitles for the deaf or hard-of-hearing being the main objects of study. The various conditions and constraints imposed by the different media forms and translation modes, which influence how translation is carried out, are often at the heart of most studies of the product or process of AVT. Many researchers in the field of AVT Studies are organized in the European Association for Studies in Screen Translation, as are many practitioners in the field.

=== Non-professional translation ===
Non-professional translation refers to the translation activities performed by translators who are not working professionally, usually in ways made possible by the Internet. These practices have mushroomed with the recent democratization of technology and the popularization of the Internet. Volunteer translation initiatives have emerged all around the world, and deal with the translations of various types of written and multimedia products.

Normally, it is not required for volunteers to have been trained in translation, but trained translators could also participate, such as the case of Translators without Borders.

Depending on the feature that each scholar considers the most important, different terms have been used to label "non-professional translation". O'Hagan has used "user-generated translation", "fan translation" and "community translation". Fernández-Costales and Jiménez-Crespo prefer "collaborative translation", while Pérez-González labels it "amateur subtitling". Pym proposes that the fundamental difference between this type of translation and professional translation relies on monetary reward, and he suggests it should be called "volunteer translation".

Some of the most popular fan-controlled non-professional translation practices are fansubbing, fandubbing, ROM hacking or fan translation of video games, and scanlation. These practices are mostly supported by a strong and consolidated fan base, although larger non-professional translation projects normally apply crowdsourcing models and are controlled by companies or organizations. Since 2008, Facebook has used crowdsourcing to have its website translated by its users and TED conference has set up the open translation project TED Translators in which volunteers use the Amara platform to create subtitles online for TED talks.

=== Localization ===
Studies of localization concern the way the contemporary language industries translate and adapt ("localize") technical texts across languages, tailoring them for a specific "locale" (a target location defined by language variety and various cultural parameters). Localization usually concerns software, product documentation, websites and video games, where the technological component is key.

A key concept in localization is internationalization, in which the start product is stripped of its culture-specific features in such a way that it can be simultaneously localized into several languages.

=== Translator education ===
The field refers to the set of pedagogical approaches used by academic educators to teach translation, train translators, and endeavor to develop the translation discipline thoroughly. Moreover, translation learners face many difficulties in trying to come up with the right equivalence of a particular source text. For these reasons, translation education is an important field of study that encompasses a number of questions to be answered in research.

=== Interpreting Studies ===
The discipline of interpreting studies is often referred to as the sister of translation studies. This is due to the similarities between the two disciplines, consisting in the transfer of ideas from one language into another. Indeed, interpreting as an activity was long seen as a specialized form of translation, before scientifically founded interpreting studies emancipated gradually from translation studies in the second half of the 20th century. While they were strongly oriented towards the theoretic framework of translation studies, interpreting studies have always been concentrating on the practical and pedagogical aspect of the activity. This led to the steady emancipation of the discipline and the consecutive development of a separate theoretical framework based—as are translation studies—on interdisciplinary premises. Interpreting studies have developed several approaches and undergone various paradigm shifts, leading to the most recent surge of sociological studies of interpreters and their work(ing conditions).

=== Metaphor ===
Metaphorical usage can challenge translators striving to balance the idiomatic with a natural style; and translation can unmask hidden metaphors. (Note: For example, the words "twin" in English or Zwilling in German express the metaphor of a twoness (English "two". German zwei, but translation of English "twin" into Russian may default to a word like близнец (bliznets), which expresses the idea of closeness (Russian: близ, lit. 'near, close') and can also apply to a triplet, quadruplet, etc.) The study of translation "can reveal new insights into the relationship between images and culture".

=== Children’s Literature Translation Studies (CLTS) ===
The study of translating for younger audiences constitutes a relatively young research field that has developed profoundly in the four decades, ever since Göte Klingberg, Swedish researcher and pedagogue, organized an International Research in Children’s Literature (IRSCL) conference in Södertälje in Sweden 1976 on the translation of children’s literature. Since then, the field has attempted to build its own research area and to gain independence and recognition from other fields. Indeed, children’s literature had itself suffered from low prestige globally and its combination with translation studies had made it considered a minor research interest in disciplines of greater standing at the time, such as comparative literature, linguistics and even translation studies.

However, due to the recent economic success of children’s and young adult literature, the establishment of international literary prizes like the Astrid Lindgren Memorial Award (ALMA), and the existence of a large number of institutions such as IRSCL (International Research Society for Children’s Literature), in addition to IBBY (International Board on Books for Young People), established scientific research/journals (The Lion and the Unicorn: A Critical Journal of Children’s Literature, Hopkins Press or Barnboken, The Swedish Institute for Children’s Books), as well as courses in children’s literature at the university level, children’s literature has gained enough prestige since the beginning of the century to be considered its own discipline.

Translation studies is also a relatively new and established scientific discipline, having been grouped together with linguistics or the study of literature after World War II. Despite the seminal work of Zohar Shavit (1986), who studied children’s literature through the lens of polysystem theory, children’s literature only began to get traction in translation studies around the turn of the century. According to Borodo, “it was not before 2000 that the term 'children’s literature translation studies' (CLTS) seems to have first appeared in [an] article by Fernández López". At the beginning of the 2000s, the field grew fast, but still, few researchers identified with this field, as the discipline was not distinct (See Borodo’s Children’s Literature Translation Studies survey from 2007). At this point things picked up with the publication of some fundamental books for the discipline such as Riita Oittinen’s Translating for Children (2000) and Gillian Lathey’s The Translation of Children’s Literature. A Reader (2006). Then, the discipline finally got its own entries in, e.g., The Routledge Encyclopedia of Translation Studies (2009) by Lathey, The Routledge Handbook of Translation Studies (2010) by Alvstad, then (2013) by O’Sullivan, and much later in The Routledge Handbook of Literary Translation (2018) by Alvstad – showing a recognition of the intersection between those two disciplines.

Some international conferences on translation and children’s literature were organized: in 2004 in Brussels there was “Children’s Literature in Translation: Challenges and Strategies”; in 2005 in London, “No Child is an Island: The Case of Children’s Books in Translation” (IBBY- International Board on Books for Young People); in 2012 in London “Crossing Boundaries: Translations and Migrations’ (IBBY) and in Brussels and Antwerp in 2017 by the Center of Reception Studies (CERES): “Translation Studies and Children’s Literature” (KU Leuven/Antwerp University), which resulted in a notable publication Children’s Literature in Translation, Texts and Contexts (2020) by Jan van Coillie and Jack McMartin. This publication won the IRSCL Edited Book Award 2021, providing official recognition of CLTS.

The pandemic put a stop to international events meeting face-to-face, but to compensate for the need of scholars to meet and interact, Pilar Alderete Diez from the University of Galway (IR) with the support of Owen Harrington from Heriot-Watt University (UK) created the Children in Translation Network (CITN) in 2021 and a webinar series on translation studies and children’s literature. The success was immediate, providing evidence of the interest in the discipline, and gathering more than 150 participants from 21 different countries.

The most recent international conference in CLTS was organized 2024 The Institute of Interpreting and Translation Studies (TÖI) of Stockholm University in Sweden under the banner of “New Voices in Children’s Literature in Translation: Culture, Power and Transnationalism”. The conference was held 22–23 August 2024 in Stockholm, Sweden, and around 120 persons attended from around 40 different countries with more than 80 presentations in two days.

As attested by the number of scientific articles/books in this specific area (e.g., 17,400 results on Google Scholar for the period 2017-2023; 3,338 results on EBSCO host for the same period), the creation of courses at the university level devoted solely to translation and children’s literature, the number of theses and dissertations being defended in this area, recent international conferences and networks like CITN identifying the growing interest for this discipline.

== Future prospects ==
Translation studies has developed alongside the growth in translation schools and courses at the university level. In 1995, a study of 60 countries revealed there were 250 bodies at university level offering courses in translation or interpreting. In 2013, the same database listed 501 translator-training institutions. Accordingly, there has been a growth in conferences on translation, translation journals and translation-related publications. The visibility acquired by translation has also led to the development of national and international associations of translation studies. Ten of these associations formed the International Network of Translation and Interpreting Studies Associations in September 2016.

The growing variety of paradigms is mentioned as one of the possible sources of conflict in the discipline. As early as 1999, the conceptual gap between non-essentialist and empirical approaches came up for debate at the Vic Forum on Training Translators and Interpreters: New Directions for the Millennium. The discussants, Rosemary Arrojo and Andrew Chesterman, explicitly sought common shared ground for both approaches.

Interdisciplinarity has made the creation of new paradigms possible, as most of the developed theories grew from contact with other disciplines like linguistics, comparative literature, cultural studies, philosophy, sociology or historiography. At the same time, it might have provoked the fragmentation of translation studies as a discipline on its own right.

A second source of conflict rises from the breach between theory and practice. As the prescriptivism of the earlier studies gives room to descriptivism and theorization, professionals see less applicability of the studies. At the same time, university research assessment places little if any importance on translation practice.

Translation studies has shown a tendency to broaden its fields of inquiry, and this trend may be expected to continue. This particularly concerns extensions into adaptation studies, intralingual translation, translation between semiotic systems (image to text to music, for example), and translation as the form of all interpretation and thus of all understanding, as suggested in Roman Jakobson's work, On Linguistic Aspects of Translation.

== See also ==
- European Society for Translation Studies
- International Doctorate in Translation Studies
- Language interpretation
- Skopos theory
- Translation
- Translation criticism
- Translation project
- Translation scholars
- Post-translation studies
