= Tymoczko =

Tymoczko is a surname. Notable people with the name include

- Dmitri Tymoczko, American music composer and theorist, son of Maria and Thomas
- Julianna Tymoczko, American mathematician, daughter of Maria and Thomas
- Maria Tymoczko, American comparative literature scholar, wife of Thomas, mother of Dmitri and Julianna
- Thomas Tymoczko, American logician and philosopher of mathematics, husband of Maria, father of Dmitri and Julianna
