= San Pellegrino University Foundation =

Educational institution

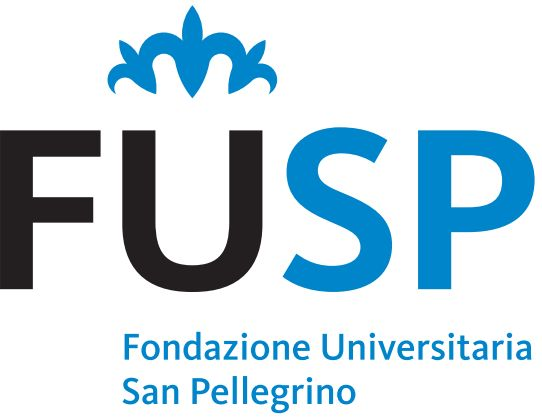
Logo

The San Pellegrino University Foundation (also referred to as FUSP or San Pellegrino) is an Italian educational institution that was established in 2010. FUSP operates internationally in the field of translation research and international communication. It inherits its academic heritage to the Servite Order, which in 1973 founded the Liceo Linguistico San Pellegrino, and, in 1987, founded the Scuola Superiore per Interpreti e Traduttori (School for Translators and Interpreters).

Founding members of FUSP include the Order of the Servants of Mary, the Municipality of Misano Adriatico, and the Nida Institute for Biblical Scholarship of New York. New partners include Gruppo Maggioli (since 2014) and Uniformazione Vicenza (since 2013).

== Academics ==
FUSP offers an undergraduate program in Cultural Mediation at the Scuola Superiore per Mediatori Linguistici (SSML) in Misano Adriatico.

The degree program operates on a semester-based academic calendar, with its fall semester running from October to December and its spring semester running from mid-February to early May. All alumni must take English as their first language and can then add up to two languages to their curriculum. Languages include Russian, Spanish, German, French, Chinese, Brazilian Portuguese and Arabic. Core modules also include General Linguistics, Italian Linguistics, Translation Theory, Elements of Economics, Geography, and Law. There is an entry-level writing test in English and Italian prior to enrollment. Exam sessions take place in January, May–June, and September–October.

Since 1987, SSML has actively participated in the Erasmus Programme. In 2014, FUSP inaugurated a separate branch of SSML located in Fasano (Brindisi), and in 2013, the SSML of Vicenza also joined the foundation.

== Research ==
FUSP is currently conducting research on these projects:

- The Nida School of Translation Studies (NSTS) is a two-week event that takes place in Misano in May every year.
- PETRA (Platforme Européenne pour la traduction littéraire).
- Translation: A Transdisciplinary Journal is an international peer-reviewed journal that, since January 2012, has been published twice a year.
- FUSP is also the venue for the Nida School of Biblical Translation (NSBT).

== Notable guests ==
Professors, academics, scholars and translators who are or have been associated with San Pellegrino or its projects since 1987. These are people who are ultimately viewed as influential in nearly the past 40 years of the academy:

- Davide Rondoni
- Tomás Albaladejo
- Camilo Rubén Fernández Cozman
- Stefano Arduini
- Susan Bassnett
- Daniele Brolli
- Peeter Torop
- Edwin Gentzler
- Vicente L. Rafael
- Eugene A. Nida
- Sandra L. Bermann
- Anthony Pym
- Lawrence Venuti
- Giuseppe Ragazzini
- Ilide Carmignani
- Elsa Támez
- Beatrice Masini
- Emanuelle Caillat

== Additional activities ==
- Premio Fondazione San Pellegrino per la Traduzione (Translation Competition for High School students) has been an annual competition since 2012. It is open to 5th-year students from public or private high schools in the provinces of Rimini, Pesaro, Ravenna and Forlì-Cesena. This competition involves translating a text from English, French, Spanish or German into Italian. The competition takes place in April every year; the winner receives prizes at the award ceremony in May.
- Premio San Pellegrino "Looking for Talent" ("Looking for Talent" Language Competition for Middle School Students) has been an annual competition since 2013. It tests the English language skills of third-year middle school students (12–13 year old's).
- Le Giornate della Traduzione Letteraria (The Literary Translation Days) is an event that takes place every year in late September – early October in Urbino since 2003. It is organized by FUSP in collaboration with the International Studies Department of History, Language and Culture at the University of Urbino. Two prizes are handed out during the event: the Zanichelli award and the Harlequin Mondadori award.
- The New York Symposium has taken place each fall since 2011.
