= Nelson Goodman =

American philosopher (1906–1998)

- Born: Henry Nelson Goodman; August 7, 1906; Somerville, Massachusetts, U.S.
- Died: November 25, 1998 (aged 92); Needham, Massachusetts, U.S.

Education
- Education: Harvard University (BA, PhD)
- Thesis: A Study of Qualities (1941)
- Doctoral advisor: C. I. Lewis

Philosophical work
- Era: 20th-century philosophy
- Region: Western philosophy
- School: Analytic; Nominalism
- Institutions: University of Pennsylvania; Harvard University
- Doctoral students: Herbert G. Bohnert, Israel Scheffler
- Notable students: Sylvain Bromberger, Noam Chomsky, Sydney Morgenbesser, Hilary Putnam, Stephen Stich, Catherine Elgin
- Main interests: Logic, epistemology, metaphysics, induction, counterfactuals, mereology, aesthetics, philosophy of science, philosophy of language
- Notable ideas: New riddle of induction, Goodman–Leonard calculus of individuals, counterfactual conditional, Goodman's method, languages of art, irrealism

Henry Nelson Goodman (7 August 1906 – 25 November 1998) was an American philosopher, known for his work on counterfactuals, mereology, the problem of induction, irrealism, and aesthetics.

== Life and career ==
Goodman was born in Somerville, Massachusetts, the son of Sarah Elizabeth (née Woodbury) and Henry Lewis Goodman. He was of Jewish origins. He graduated from Harvard University, AB, magna cum laude (1928). During the 1930s, he ran an art gallery in Boston, Massachusetts, while studying for a Harvard PhD in philosophy, which he completed in 1941. His experience as an art dealer helps explain his later turn towards aesthetics, where he became better known than in logic and analytic philosophy. During World War II, he served as a psychologist in the US Army.

He taught at the University of Pennsylvania, 1946–1964, where his students included Noam Chomsky, Sidney Morgenbesser, Stephen Stich, and Hilary Putnam. He was a research fellow at the Harvard Center for Cognitive Studies from 1962 to 1963 and was a professor at Brandeis University from 1964 to 1967, before being appointed Professor of Philosophy at Harvard in 1968.

In 1967, at the Harvard Graduate School of Education, he was the founding director of Harvard Project Zero, a basic research project in artistic cognition and artistic education. He remained the director for four years and served as an informal adviser for many years thereafter.

Goodman died in Needham, Massachusetts.

== Philosophical work ==
=== Induction and "grue" ===
In his book Fact, Fiction, and Forecast, Goodman introduced the "new riddle of induction", so-called by analogy with Hume's classical problem of induction. He accepted Hume's observation that inductive reasoning (i.e. inferring from past experience about events in the future) was based solely on human habit and regularities to which our day-to-day existence has accustomed us. Goodman argued, however, that Hume overlooked the fact that some regularities establish habits (a given piece of copper conducting electricity increases the credibility of statements asserting that other pieces of copper conduct electricity) while some do not (the fact that a given man in a room is a third son does not increase the credibility of statements asserting that other men in this room are third sons).

Hempel's confirmation theory argued that the solution is to differentiate between hypotheses, which apply to all things of a certain class, and evidence statements, which apply to only one thing. Goodman's famous counterargument was to introduce the predicate grue, which applies to all things examined before a certain time t just in case they are green, but also to other things just in case they are blue and not examined before time t. If we examine emeralds before time t and find that emerald a is green, emerald b is green, and so forth, each will confirm the hypothesis that all emeralds are green. However, emeralds a, b, c,..etc. also confirm the hypothesis that all emeralds are grue. Thus, before time t, the apparently law-like statements "All emeralds are green" and "All emeralds are grue" are equally well confirmed by observation, but obviously "All emeralds are grue" is not a law-like statement.

Goodman's example showed that the difficulty in determining what constitutes law-like statements is far greater than previously thought, and that once again we find ourselves facing the initial dilemma that "anything can confirm anything".

=== Nominalism and mereology ===
Goodman, along with Stanislaw Lesniewski, is the founder of the contemporary variant of nominalism, which argues that philosophy, logic, and mathematics should dispense with set theory. Goodman's nominalism was driven purely by ontological considerations. After a long and difficult 1947 paper coauthored with W. V. O. Quine, Goodman ceased to trouble himself with finding a way to reconstruct mathematics while dispensing with set theory – discredited as sole foundations of mathematics as of 1913 (Russell and Whitehead, in Principia Mathematica).

The program of David Hilbert to reconstruct it from logical axioms was proven futile in 1931 by Gödel. Because of this and other failures of seemingly fruitful lines of research, Quine soon came to believe that such a reconstruction was impossible, but Goodman's Penn colleague Richard Milton Martin argued otherwise, writing a number of papers suggesting ways forward.

According to Thomas Tymoczko's afterword in New directions in the philosophy of mathematics, Quine had "urged that we abandon ad hoc devices distinguishing mathematics from science and just accept the resulting assimilation", putting the "key burden on the theories (networks of sentences) that we accept, not on the individual sentences whose significance can change dramatically depending on their theoretical context." In so doing, Tymoczko claimed, philosophy of mathematics and philosophy of science were merged into quasi-empiricism: the emphasis of mathematical practice as effectively part of the scientific method, an emphasis on method over result.

The Goodman–Leonard (1940) calculus of individuals is the starting point for the American variant of mereology. While the exposition in Goodman and Leonard invoked a bit of naive set theory, the variant of the calculus of individuals that grounds Goodman's 1951 The Structure of Appearance, a revision and extension of his PhD thesis, makes no mention of the notion of set (while his PhD thesis still did). Simons (1987) and Casati and Varzi (1999) show that the calculus of individuals can be grounded in either a bit of set theory, or monadic predicates, schematically employed. Mereology is accordingly "ontologically neutral" and retains some of Quine's pragmatism (which Tymoczko in 1998 carefully qualified as American Pragmatism).

== Select bibliography ==
- "The Calculus of Individuals and Its Uses" (with Henry S. Leonard), Journal of Symbolic Logic 5 (1940): 45–55.
- A Study of Qualities (doctoral thesis). Diss. Harvard U., 1941. Reprinted 1990, by Garland (New York), as part of its Harvard dissertations in Philosophy Series.
- "A Query on Confirmation ", The Journal of Philosophy (1946): Vol.43, No.14, pp. 383–385.
- "Steps Toward a Constructive Nominalism", co-authored with W. V. O. Quine, Journal of Symbolic Logic, 12 (1947): 105–122, Reprinted in Nelson Goodman, Problems and Projects (Bobbs-Merrill, 1972): 173–198.
- The Structure of Appearance. Harvard UP, 1951. 2nd ed. Indianapolis: Bobbs-Merrill, 1966. 3rd ed. Boston: Reidel, 1977.
- Fact, Fiction, and Forecast. Cambridge, MA: Harvard UP, 1955. 2nd ed. Indianapolis: Bobbs-Merrill, 1965. 3rd. ed. Indianapolis: Bobbs-Merrill, 1973. 4th ed. Cambridge, MA: Harvard UP, 1983.
- Languages of Art: An Approach to a Theory of Symbols. Indianapolis: Bobbs-Merrill, 1968. 2nd ed. Indianapolis: Hackett, 1976. Based on his 1960–61 John Locke lectures.
- Problems and Projects. Indianapolis: Bobbs-Merrill, 1972.
- Basic Abilities Required for Understanding and Creation in the Arts: Final Report (with David Perkins, Howard Gardner, and the assistance of Jeanne Bamberger et al.) Cambridge: Harvard University, Graduate School of Education: Project No. 9-0283, Grant No. OEG-0-9-310283-3721 (010), 1972.
- Ways of Worldmaking. Indianapolis: Hackett, 1978. ISBN 0915144522 Paperback ISBN 0915144514
- Of Mind and Other Matters. Cambridge, MA: Harvard UP, 1984. 1984 pbk edition. Harvard University Press. 1984. ISBN 0-674-63126-9.
- Reconceptions in Philosophy and other Arts and Sciences (with Catherine Elgin). Indianapolis: Hackett; London: Routledge, 1988. Paperback Edition, London: Routledge, Indianapolis: Hackett, 1990.

Source: Complete International Bibliography

== See also ==
- American philosophy
- List of American philosophers
