= San Pellegrino =

San Pellegrino may refer to:

- S.Pellegrino, an Italian natural mineral water brand
- San Pellegrino (cycling team), an Italian professional cycling team that existed from 1956 to 1963
- San Pellegrino Terme, comune in the province of Bergamo, Lombardy, Italy
- Passo San Pellegrino, an Italian pass in the Alps
- San Pellegrino di Belluno, a quarter in Belluno
- San Pellegrino University Foundation
- San Pellegrino Awards

== Architecture ==
- San Pellegrino in Alpe, a Roman Catholic church and adjacent hostel-hospital complex in Castiglione di Garfagnana, province of Lucca, region of Tuscany, Italy
- San Pellegrino alla Sapienza, a Gothic style, Roman Catholic church located in Siena, region of Tuscany, Italy
- San Pellegrino in Vaticano, an ancient Roman Catholic oratory in the Vatican City
