= Bohnert =

Bohnert is a German-language surname. Notable people with this name include:

- Florian Bohnert (b. 1997), Luxembourg footballer
- Gertrude Bohnert (1908–1948), Swiss painter
- Herbert G. Bohnert (1918–1984), American philosopher
- Jean-François Bohnert, French magistrate
