= Catherine Elgin =

American philosopher (born 1948)

Catherine Z. Elgin
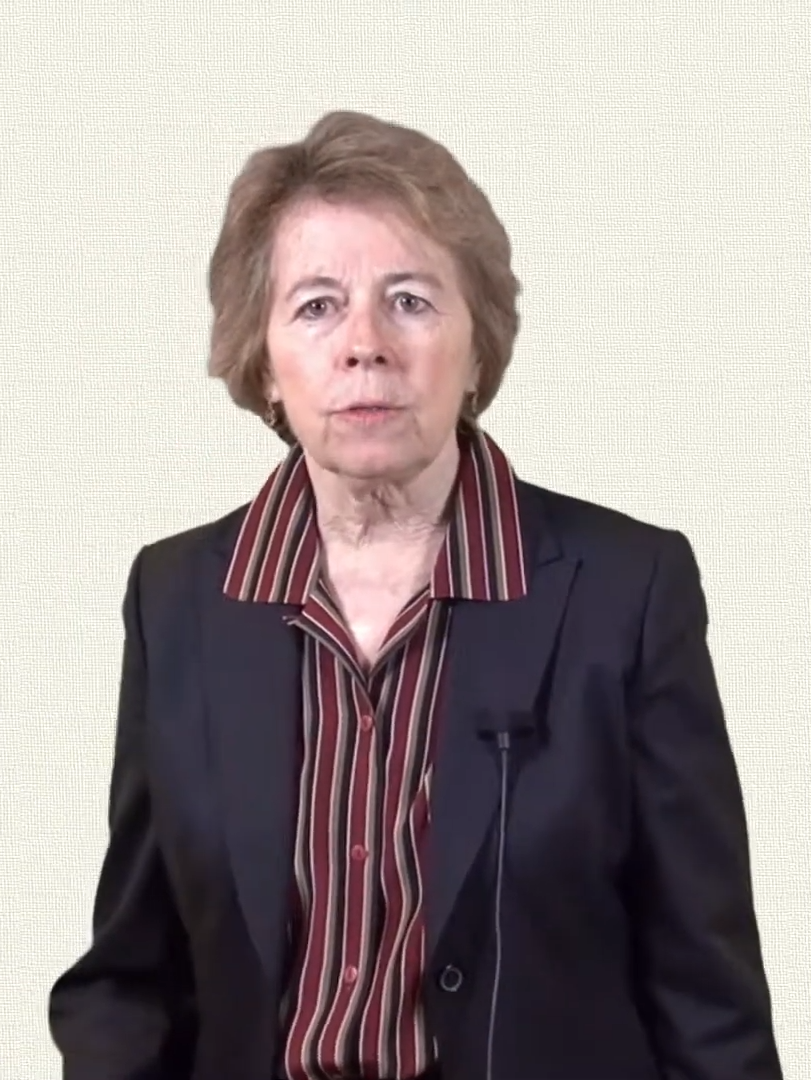
- Elgin in 2017
- Born: 1948

Education
- Education: Brandeis University

Philosophical work
- Institutions: Harvard University
- Main interests: epistemology and the philosophies of art and science

Catherine Z. Elgin (born 1948) is a philosopher working in epistemology and the philosophies of art and science. She is currently a professor of philosophy of education at the Graduate School of Education at Harvard University.

== Education and career ==
She holds a Ph.D. from Brandeis University where she studied with Nelson Goodman. She has held tenure-track and visiting positions at many universities, including Michigan State University, Vassar College, Princeton University, and MIT. In 2023, she was elected a Fellow of the American Academy of Arts & Sciences.

== Philosophical work ==
Elgin's work has considered such questions as "what makes something cognitively valuable?" As an epistemologist, she considers the pursuit of understanding to be of higher value than the pursuit of knowledge.

In Considered Judgment, Elgin argues for "a reconception that takes reflective equilibrium as the standard of rational acceptability."

== Works ==
- With Reference to Reference, Hackett, 1983
- Reconceptions in Philosophy and Other Arts and Sciences, with Nelson Goodman, Routledge, 1988
  - German translation: Revisionen. Philosophie und andere Künste und Wissenschaften, 1993
- (ed.) The Philosophy of Nelson Goodman, v. 1. Nominalism, Constructivism, and Relativism, ISBN 0-8153-2609-2, v. 2. Nelson Goodman's New Riddle of Induction, ISBN 0-8153-2610-6, v. 3. Nelson Goodman's Philosophy of Art, ISBN 0-8153-2611-4, v. 4. Nelson Goodman's Theory of Symbols and its Applications, ISBN 0-8153-2612-2, 1997
- Between the Absolute and the Arbitrary Cornell University Press, 1997
- Considered Judgment, Princeton University Press, 1996
- (ed.) Philosophical Inquiry: Classic and Contemporary Readings, with Jonathan E. Adler. 2007
- "Begging to differ", The Philosophers' Magazine, December, 2012
- True Enough, MIT Press, 2017
- "Understanding in Science and Elsewhere": Interview with Catherine Z. Elgin about her philosophy and her intellectual biography, published 2019 on 3:AM Magazine and republished on 3:16

== Awards ==
In 2023, Elgin was elected into the American Academy of Arts and Sciences.

== See also ==
- American philosophy
- List of American philosophers
