= Siri Nergaard =

Norwegian translation scholar (born 1962)

Siri Nergaard (born 1962) is a Norwegian scholar of translation and Scandinavian studies.

Siri Nergaard graduated from the University of Oslo and then the University of Bologna. Nergaard taught Norwegian at the University of Florence. Currently she lectures at the University of South-Eastern Norway at the Vestfold campus. Her research areas include semiotics, cultural studies, and translation studies. In 2011 she became the editor-in-chief of Translation: A Transdisciplinary Journal. Together with Stefano Arduini she is credited for coining the concept of post-translation studies. Nergaard has also translated works by Umberto Eco into Norwegian.

== Selected works ==
- Translation and Transmigration (Routledge 2021)
- La costruzione di una cultura. La letteratura norvegese in traduzione italiana (Guaraldi 2004)
- La teoria della traduzione nella storia (editor; Bompiani 2014)
- Teorie contemporanee della traduzione (editor; Bompiani 2014)
- Studi culturali: temi e prospettive a confronto (co-editor; McGraw-Hill 2007)
- Spettri del potere: ideologia, identità, traduzione negli studi culturali (co-editor; Meltemi 2002)
