= Languages of Art =

1968 work by book by Nelson Goodman

Languages of Art: An Approach to a Theory of Symbols
- Title page for Languages of Art: An Approach to a Theory of Symbols (1968)
- Author: Nelson Goodman
- Language: English
- Genre: Non-fiction
- Publication date: 1968

Languages of Art: An Approach to a Theory of Symbols is a book by the American philosopher Nelson Goodman. It is a work of 20th century aesthetics in the analytic tradition. Originally published in 1968, it was revised in 1976. Goodman continued to refine and update these theories in essay form for the rest of his career.

== A general theory of symbols ==
Languages of Art ostensibly concerns only the philosophy of art, but in the book's introduction, Goodman says that by the "languages" in the book's title, he means "symbol systems" in general. Central to the book's thesis is the concept of reference.

== Resemblance vs. representation ==
In the first section of the book, Goodman challenges the common assumption that something must resemble another thing to represent it. He does by appealing both to common sense and to mathematical relation theory. Instead, he suggests that representation be seen as a particular type of arbitrary denotation.

== Denotation vs. exemplification ==
Denotation and exemplification are both types of reference. Goodman calls denotation the "core of representation." (5) Something is denoted when it is referred to by a label but does not "possess" it.

Exemplification is possession plus reference. "While anything may be denoted, only labels may be exemplified." (57)

== Authenticity: autographic vs. allographic ==
In this section of the book, Goodman calls attention to a peculiar problem in the philosophy of art: why is it that a painting can be forged while a piece of music cannot? After verifying that there is indeed an important aesthetic difference between an original and a forgery and clarifying its nature, Goodman suggests an answer to the question. His answer is that works in a form of art can be forged if and only if ("iff") there is no possible notation to specify which are and are not authentic works.

In other words, a piece of music can be written down as a score, so any performance which corresponds suitably to the score is counted as authentic; there is no such notation to define what is and what isn't an authentic instance of a painting, so a painting can be forged.

== Theory of notation ==
In this, the key section of the book, Goodman expands on his idea of a notational system introduced in the previous chapter. For Goodman, a symbol system is a formal language with a grammar consisting of syntactic rules and semantics rules. A symbol system is called notational if it meets certain properties, notably that its symbols are non-compact.

== Score, sketch and script ==
Goodman evaluates the common notational methods of musical and theatrical performance, drawing and painting, dance and architecture. None of the art forms adhere to his ideal notation, but they are nonetheless sufficient for their purpose. Despite the critiques Goodman makes of the common vocabulary of art discussion, he does not believe that, "the exigencies that dictate technical discourse need govern our everyday speech." (187)
