= Turkey illusion =

Cognitive bias

Turkey illusion is a cognitive bias describing the surprise resulting from a break in a trend, if one does not know the causes or the framework conditions for this trend. The concept was first introduced by Bertrand Russell to illustrate a problem with inductive reasoning.

Relevant disciplines for uncovering such biases include psychology and behavioral economics.

== The story ==
In a variation from Russell's original, a turkey designated for Thanksgiving is fed and cared for every day until it is slaughtered. With each feeding, its certainty or confidence that nothing will happen to it increases, based on past experience. From the turkey's point of view, the certainty that it will be fed and cared for again the next day is greatest on the night before it dies, of all days. Nevertheless, it is slaughtered that day, by the very person who cared for it.

The story appears in Bertrand Russell's 1912 The Problems of Philosophy as relating to a chicken:

The man who has fed the chicken every day throughout its life at last wrings its neck instead, showing that more refined views as to the uniformity of nature would have been useful to the chicken.

== Interpretation ==
The slaughter comes as a complete surprise to the turkey, who - in anthropomorphic formulation - "only extrapolates a trend" and "does not recognize the impending trend break". To recognize this trend break, the turkey would have had to find out the causes of the trend. By doing so, it would have known about the motivational state of the human who feeds it every day. In order to "think outside the box" and leave known or familiar thought patterns, creativity and the ability to change perspectives are necessary. This is not possible for the turkey due to insufficient information.

== See also ==
- Problem of induction
