= Post-translation studies =

Post-translation studies is a concept which refers to a stage in the development of translation studies during the 20th century. The term was coined in 2011 by Siri Nergaard and Stefano Arduini in the first issue of Translation: A Transdisciplinary Journal, and further developed by Edwin Gentzler.

An important area of post-translation studies is post-colonial translation studies, which look at translations between a metropolis and former colonies, or within complex former colonies. They strongly question the assumption that translation occurs between cultures and languages that are radically separated. Further, the concept is instrumental to the understanding of modern cultural trends, such as new versions of European classical works as seen by "other" peoples of the world.

Some scholars disagree whether this concept is just part of translation studies, used for activities in the post-translation stage (studying the stage after the production of the translation, its effects, its reception), or if it is an attempt to declare the death of a discipline.

== Bibliography ==
- Gentzler, Edwin (2017). Translation and rewriting in the age of post-translation studies. London: Routledge.

== See also ==
- Translation
- Translation criticism
- Translation project
- Translation scholars
