= New riddle of induction =

Philosophical paradox introduced by Nelson Goodman

The new riddle of induction was presented by Nelson Goodman in Fact, Fiction, and Forecast as a successor to Hume's original problem. It presents the logical predicates grue and bleen which are unusual due to their time-dependence. Many have tried to solve the new riddle on those terms, but Hilary Putnam and others have argued such time-dependency depends on the language adopted, and in some languages it is equally true for natural-sounding predicates such as "green". For Goodman they illustrate the problem of projectible predicates and ultimately, which empirical generalizations are law-like and which are not. Goodman's construction and use of grue and bleen illustrates how philosophers use simple examples in conceptual analysis.

== Grue and bleen ==
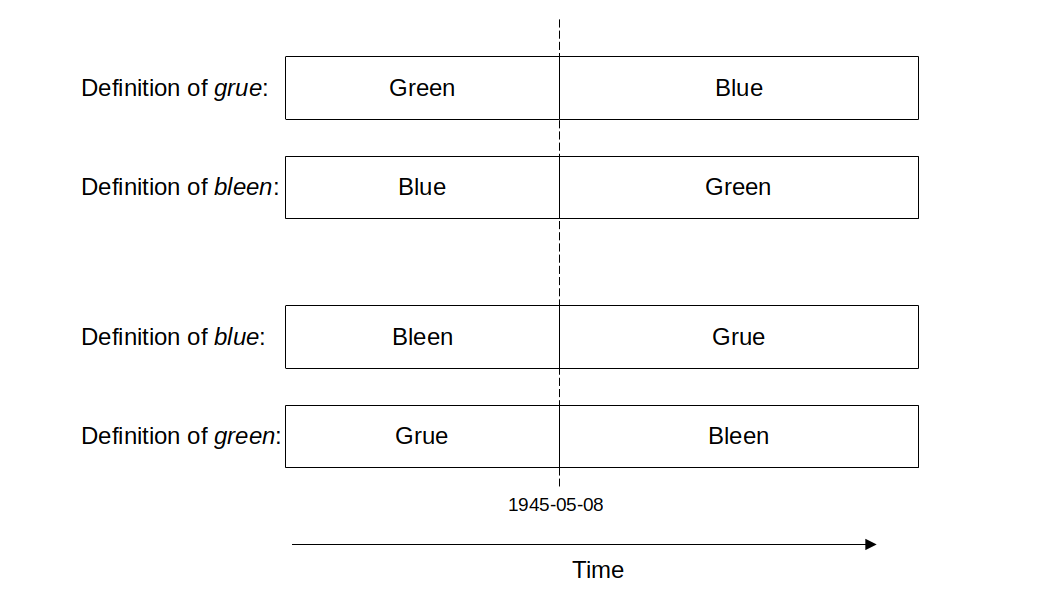
Definitions of grue and bleen, as well as how the original colors blue and green can be redefined based on the two predicates

Goodman defined "grue" relative to an arbitrary but fixed time t: (Note: Historically, Goodman used "V-E day" and "a certain time t" in A Query on Confirmation (p. 383) and Fact, fiction, and forecast (3rd ed. 1973, p. 73), respectively.) an object is grue if and only if it is observed before t and is green, or else is not so observed and is blue. An object is "bleen" if and only if it is observed before t and is blue, or else is not so observed and is green.

For some arbitrary future time t, say January 1, 2036, for all green things observed prior to t, such as emeralds and well-watered grass, both the predicates green and grue apply. Likewise for all blue things observed prior to t, such as bluebirds or blue flowers, both the predicates blue and bleen apply. On January 2, 2036, however, emeralds and well-watered grass are bleen, and bluebirds or blue flowers are grue. The predicates grue and bleen are not the kinds of predicates used in everyday life or in science, but they apply in just the same way as the predicates green and blue up until some future time t. From the perspective of observers before time t it is indeterminate which predicates are future projectible (green and blue or grue and bleen).

== The new riddle of induction ==
In this section, Goodman's new riddle of induction is outlined in order to set the context for his introduction of the predicates grue and bleen and thereby illustrate their philosophical importance.

=== The old problem of induction and its dissolution ===
Goodman poses Hume's problem of induction as a problem of the validity of the predictions we make. Since predictions are about what has yet to be observed and because there is no necessary connection between what has been observed and what will be observed, there is no objective justification for these predictions. Deductive logic cannot be used to infer predictions about future observations based on past observations because there are no valid rules of deductive logic for such inferences. Hume's answer was that observations of one kind of event following another kind of event result in habits of regularity (i.e., associating one kind of event with another kind). Predictions are then based on these regularities or habits of mind.

Goodman takes Hume's answer to be a serious one. He rejects other philosophers' objection that Hume is merely explaining the origin of our predictions and not their justification. His view is that Hume has identified something deeper. To illustrate this, Goodman turns to the problem of justifying a system of rules of deduction. For Goodman, the validity of a deductive system is justified by its conformity to good deductive practice. The justification of rules of a deductive system depends on our judgements about whether to reject or accept specific deductive inferences. Thus, for Goodman, the problem of induction dissolves into the same problem as justifying a deductive system and while, according to Goodman, Hume was on the right track with habits of mind, the problem is more complex than Hume realized.

In the context of justifying rules of induction, this becomes the problem of confirmation of generalizations for Goodman. However, the confirmation is not a problem of justification but instead it is a problem of precisely defining how evidence confirms generalizations. It is with this turn that grue and bleen have their philosophical role in Goodman's view of induction.

=== Projectible predicates ===
US government example for time-dependent predicates: Before March 1797, arbitrarily many observations would support both versions of the prediction "The US forces were always commanded by { ^{George Washington}_{the US President} }, hence they will be commanded by him in the future", which today is known as { ^{false}_{true} }, similar to "Emeralds were always { ^{grue}_{green} }, hence they will be so in the future".

The new riddle of induction, for Goodman, rests on our ability to distinguish lawlike from non-lawlike generalizations. Lawlike generalizations are capable of confirmation while non-lawlike generalizations are not. Lawlike generalizations are required for making predictions. Using examples from Goodman, the generalization that all copper conducts electricity is capable of confirmation by a particular piece of copper whereas the generalization that all men in a given room are third sons is not lawlike but accidental. The generalization that all copper conducts electricity is a basis for predicting that this piece of copper will conduct electricity. The generalization that all men in a given room are third sons, however, is not a basis for predicting that a given man in that room is a third son.

The question, therefore, is what makes some generalizations lawlike and others accidental. This, for Goodman, becomes a problem of determining which predicates are projectible (i.e., can be used in lawlike generalizations that serve as predictions) and which are not. Goodman argues that this is where the fundamental problem lies. This problem is known as Goodman's paradox: from the apparently strong evidence that all emeralds examined thus far have been green, one may inductively conclude that all future emeralds will be green. However, whether this prediction is lawlike or not depends on the predicates used in this prediction. Goodman observed that (assuming t has yet to pass) it is equally true that every emerald that has been observed is grue. Thus, by the same evidence we can conclude that all future emeralds will be grue. The new problem of induction becomes one of distinguishing projectible predicates such as green and blue from non-projectible predicates such as grue and bleen.

Hume, Goodman argues, missed this problem. We do not, by habit, form generalizations from all associations of events we have observed but only some of them. All past observed emeralds were green, and we formed a habit of thinking the next emerald will be green, but they were equally grue, and we do not form habits concerning grueness. Lawlike predictions (or projections) ultimately are distinguishable by the predicates we use. Goodman's solution is to argue that lawlike predictions are based on projectible predicates such as green and blue and not on non-projectible predicates such as grue and bleen and what makes predicates projectible is their entrenchment, which depends on their successful past projections. Thus, grue and bleen function in Goodman's arguments to both illustrate the new riddle of induction and to illustrate the distinction between projectible and non-projectible predicates via their relative entrenchment.

== Responses ==
One response is to appeal to the artificially disjunctive definition of grue. The notion of predicate entrenchment is not required. Goodman said that this does not succeed. If we take grue and bleen as primitive predicates, we can define green as "grue if first observed before t and bleen otherwise", and likewise for blue. To deny the acceptability of this disjunctive definition of green would be to beg the question.

Another proposed resolution that does not require predicate entrenchment is that "x is grue" is not solely a predicate of x, but of x and a time t—we can know that an object is green without knowing the time t, but we cannot know that it is grue. If this is the case, we should not expect "x is grue" to remain true when the time changes. However, one might ask why "x is green" is not considered a predicate of a particular time t—the more common definition of green does not require any mention of a time t, but the definition grue does. Goodman also addresses and rejects this proposed solution as question begging because blue can be defined in terms of grue and bleen, which explicitly refer to time.

=== Swinburne ===
Richard Swinburne gets past the objection that green may be redefined in terms of grue and bleen by making a distinction based on how we test for the applicability of a predicate in a particular case. He distinguishes between qualitative and locational predicates. Qualitative predicates, like green, can be assessed without knowing the spatial or temporal relation of x to a particular time, place or event. Locational predicates, like grue, cannot be assessed without knowing the spatial or temporal relation of x to a particular time, place or event, in this case whether x is being observed before or after time t. Although green can be given a definition in terms of the locational predicates grue and bleen, this is irrelevant to the fact that green meets the criterion for being a qualitative predicate whereas grue is merely locational. He concludes that if some x's under examination—like emeralds—satisfy both a qualitative and a locational predicate, but projecting these two predicates yields conflicting predictions, namely, whether emeralds examined after time t shall appear grue or green, we should project the qualitative predicate, in this case green.

=== Carnap ===
Rudolf Carnap responded to Goodman's 1946 article. Carnap's approach to inductive logic is based on the notion of degree of confirmation c(h,e) of a given hypothesis h by a given evidence e. (Note: he uses another variant, c^{*}(h,e), for which he gives a formula to compute actual values; different from Laplace's Rule of Succession. See Carnap's book Studies in inductive logic and probability, Vol.1. University of California Press, 1971, for more details, in particular sect.IV.16 for c, and app.A.1 for c^{*}.) Both h and e are logical formulas expressed in a simple language L which allows for

- multiple quantification ("for every x there is a y such that ..."),
- unary and binary predicate symbols (properties and relations), and
- an equality relation "=".

The universe of discourse consists of denumerably many individuals, each of which is designated by its own constant symbol; such individuals are meant to be regarded as positions ("like space-time points in our actual world") rather than extended physical bodies. A state description is a (usually infinite) conjunction containing every possible ground atomic sentence, either negated or unnegated; such a conjunction describes a possible state of the whole universe. Carnap requires the following semantic properties:

- Atomic sentences must be logically independent of each other. In particular, different constant symbols must designate different and entirely separate individuals. (Note: For example, if a and b had a part in common, then "a is warm and b is not warm" would be an impossible combination.) Moreover, different predicates must be logically independent. (Note: For example, "is a raven" and "is a bird" cannot both be admitted predicates, since the former would exclude the negation of the latter. As another example, "is warm" and "is warmer than" cannot both be predicates, since "a is warm and b is warmer than a and b is not warm" is an impossible combination.) (Note: Carnap argues that logical independence is required for deductive logic as well, in order for the set of analytical sentences to be decidable.)
- The qualities and relations designated by the predicates must be simple, i.e. they must not be analyzable into simpler components. Apparently, Carnap had in mind an irreflexive, partial, and well-founded order (Note: Carnap doesn't consider predicates that are mutually definable by each other, leading to a preorder.) is simpler than.
- The set of primitive predicates in L must be complete, i.e. every respect in which two positions in the universe may be found to differ by direct observation, must be expressible in L.

Carnap distinguishes three kinds of properties:

1. Purely qualitative properties; that is, properties expressible without using individual constants, but not without primitive predicates,
2. Purely positional properties; that is, properties expressible without primitive predicates, and
3. Mixed properties; that is, all remaining expressible properties.

To illuminate this taxonomy, let x be a variable and a a constant symbol; then an example of 1. could be "x is blue or x is non-warm", an example of 2. "x = a", and an example of 3. "x is red and not x = a".

Based on his theory of inductive logic sketched above, Carnap formalizes Goodman's notion of projectibility of a property W as follows: the higher the relative frequency of W in an observed sample, the higher is the probability that a non-observed individual has the property W. Carnap suggests "as a tentative answer" to Goodman, that all purely qualitative properties are projectible, all purely positional properties are non-projectible, and mixed properties require further investigation.

=== Quine ===
Willard Van Orman Quine discusses an approach to consider only "natural kinds" as projectible predicates. He first relates Goodman's grue paradox to Hempel's raven paradox by defining two predicates F and G to be (simultaneously) projectible if all their shared instances count toward confirmation of the claim "each F is a G". Then Hempel's paradox just shows that the complements of projectible predicates (such as "is a raven", and "is black") need not be projectible, (Note: Observing a black raven is considered to confirm the claim "all ravens are black", while the logically equivalent claim "all non-black things are non-ravens" is not considered to be confirmed by observing e.g. a green leaf.) while Goodman's paradox shows that "is green" is projectible, but "is grue" is not.

Next, Quine reduces projectibility to the subjective notion of similarity. Two green emeralds are usually considered more similar than two grue ones if only one of them is green. Observing a green emerald makes us expect a similar observation (i.e., a green emerald) next time. Green emeralds are a natural kind, but grue emeralds are not. Quine investigates "the dubious scientific standing of a general notion of similarity, or of kind". Both are basic to thought and language, like the logical notions of e.g. identity, negation, disjunction. However, it remains unclear how to relate the logical notions to similarity or kind; (Note: Defining two things to be similar if they have all, or most, or many, properties in common doesn't make sense if properties, like mathematical sets, take things in every possible combination. Assuming a finite universe of n things, any two of them belong to exactly 2^{n-2} sets, and share exactly that number of extensional properties. Watanabe called this the "Ugly duckling theorem".) Quine therefore tries to relate at least the latter two notions to each other.

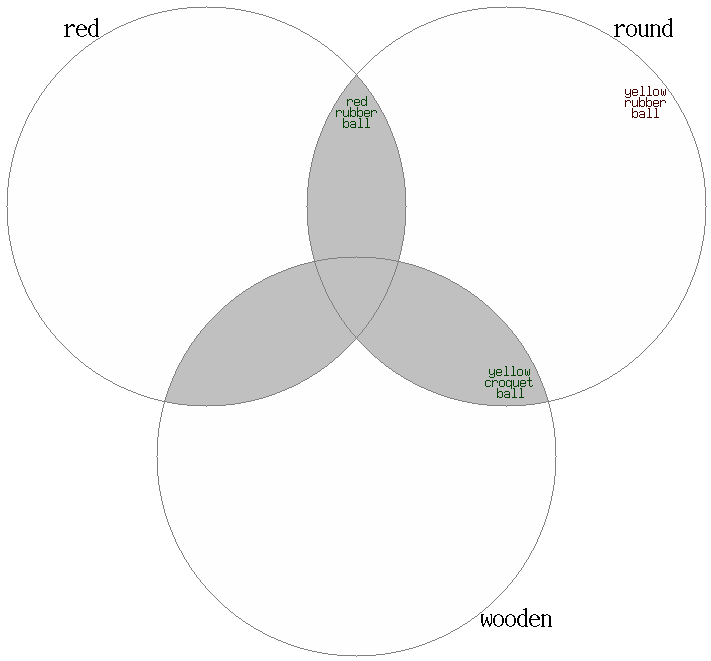
Goodman's counter-example against a definition of "natural kind" based on Carnap

Failed attempt to define a kind as the set of all objects x that are more similar to a "paradigm" object p than p is to a "foil" object, in analogy to the definition of a circle area in geometry

Relation between similarity and kind

Assuming finitely many kinds only, the notion of similarity can be defined by that of kind: an object A is more similar to B than to C if A and B belong jointly to more kinds (Note: Rather than arbitrary sets) than A and C do. (Note: Quines uses this ternary relation in order to admit different levels of similarity, such that e.g. red things can be more similar to each other than just colored things.)

Vice versa, it remains again unclear how to define kind by similarity. Defining e.g. the kind of red things as the set of all things that are more similar to a fixed "paradigmatical" red object than this is to another fixed "foil" non-red object (cf. left picture) isn't satisfactory, since the degree of overall similarity, including e.g. shape, weight, will afford little evidence of degree of redness. (In the picture, the yellow paprika might be considered more similar to the red one than the orange.)

An alternative approach inspired by Carnap defines a natural kind to be a set whose members are more similar to each other than each non-member is to at least one member. (Note: Formally: A set K is a kind if ∀Y ∉ K. ∃ X_{1} ∈ K. ∀ X_{2} ∈ K. (X_{1} is more similar to X_{2} than to Y).) However, Goodman argued, that this definition would make the set of all red round things, red wooden things, and round wooden things (cf. right picture) meet the proposed definition of a natural kind, (Note: Each member of the set resembles each other member in being red, or in being round, or in being wooden, or even in several of these properties.) while "surely it is not what anyone means by a kind". (Note: The set contains e.g. yellow croquet balls and red rubber balls, but not yellow rubber balls.)

While neither of the notions of similarity and kind can be defined by the other, they at least vary together: if A is reassessed to be more similar to C than to B rather than the other way around, the assignment of A, B, C to kinds will be permuted correspondingly; and conversely.

Basic importance of similarity and kind

In language, every general term owes its generality to some resemblance of the things referred to. Learning to use a word depends on a double resemblance, viz. between the present and past circumstances in which the word was used, and between the present and past phonetic utterances of the word.

Every reasonable expectation depends on resemblance of circumstances, together with our tendency to expect similar causes to have similar effects. This includes any scientific experiment, since it can be reproduced only under similar, but not under completely identical, circumstances. Already Heraclitus' famous saying "No man ever steps in the same river twice" highlighted the distinction between similar and identical circumstances.

Birds' similarity relations

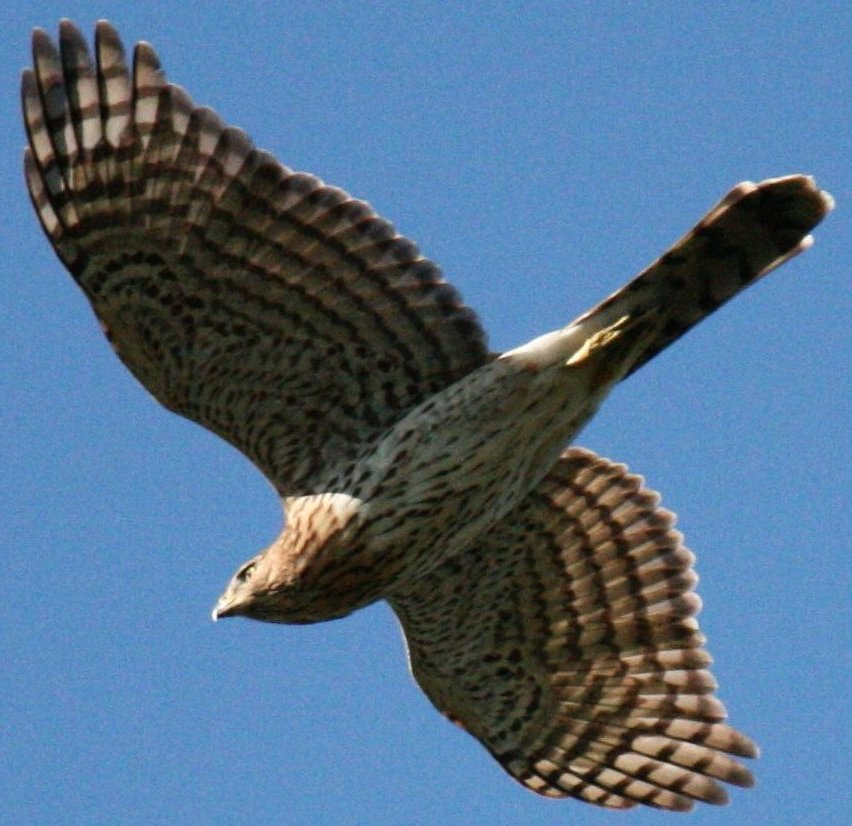

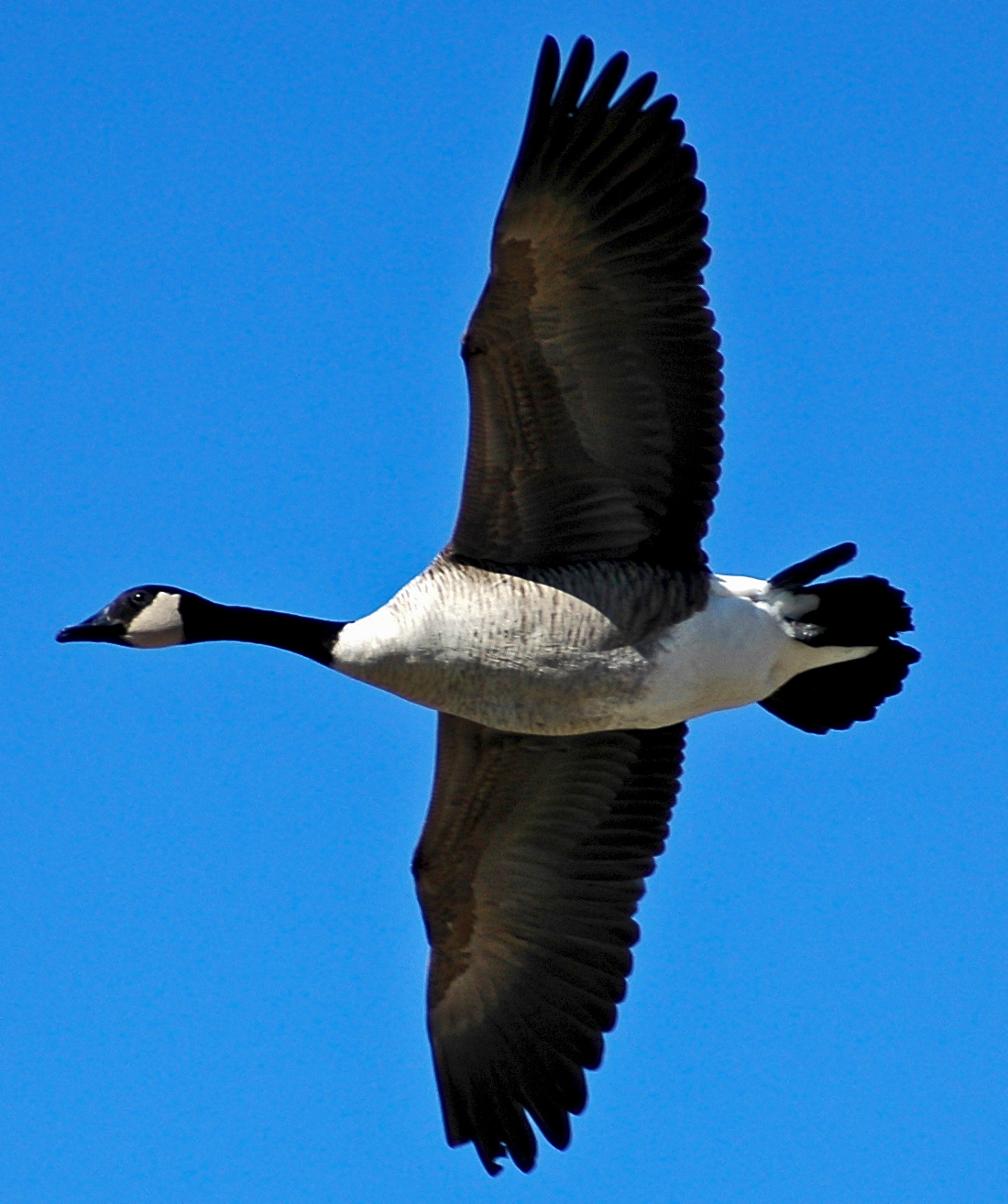

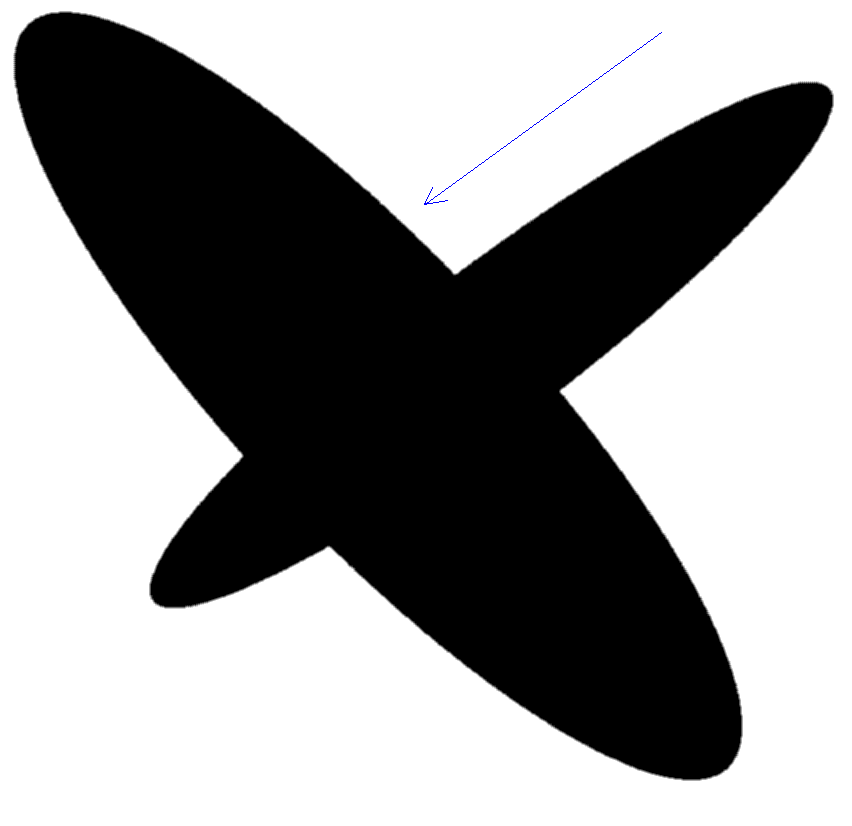

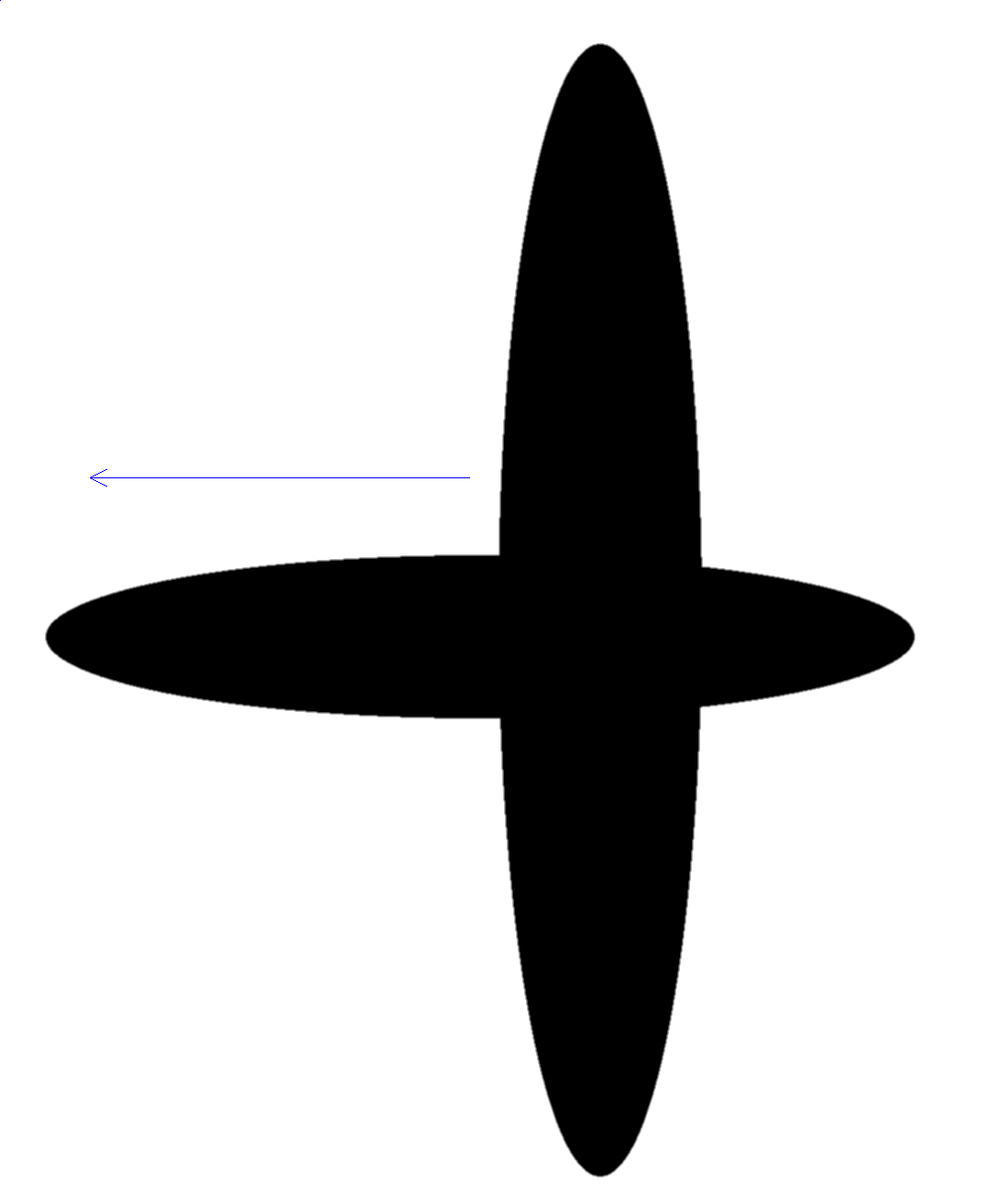

Tinbergen and Lorentz demonstrated a coarse similarity relation of inexperienced turkey chicks. Upper row: real hawk (left) and goose (right) in flight. Lower row: cardboard dummies releasing similar reactions as their originals.

Genesis of similarity and kind

In a behavioral sense, humans and other animals have an innate standard of similarity. It is part of our animal birthright, and characteristically animal in its lack of intellectual status, e.g. its alienness to mathematics and logic, cf. bird example.

==== Habit formation ====
Induction itself is essentially animal expectation or habit formation. Ostensive learning is a case of induction, and a curiously comfortable one, since each man's spacing of qualities and kind is enough like his neighbor's. In contrast, the "brute irrationality of our sense of similarity" offers little reason to expect it being somehow in tune with the unanimated nature, which we never made. (Note: Quine seems to allude to Vico's verum factum principle here.) Why inductively obtained theories about it should be trusted is the perennial philosophical problem of induction. Quine, following Watanabe, suggests Darwin's theory as an explanation: if people's innate spacing of qualities is a gene-linked trait, then the spacing that has made for the most successful inductions will have tended to predominate through natural selection. However, this cannot account for the human ability to dynamically refine one's spacing of qualities in the course of getting acquainted with a new area. (Note: Demonstrated by psychological experiments e.g. about classification of previously unseen artificial objects, like "Greebles".)

== Similar predicates used in philosophical analysis ==
=== Quus ===
In his book Wittgenstein on Rules and Private Language, Saul Kripke proposed a related argument that leads to skepticism about meaning rather than skepticism about induction, as part of his personal interpretation (nicknamed "Kripkenstein" by some) of the private language argument. He proposed a new form of addition, which he called quus, which is identical with "+" in all cases except those in which either of the numbers added are equal to or greater than 57; in which case the answer would be 5, i.e.:

$$x\text{ quus }y= \begin{cases} x+y & \text{for }x,y <57 \\[12pt] 5 & \text{for } x\ge 57 \text{  or  } y\ge57 \end{cases}$$

He then asks how, given certain obvious circumstances, anyone could know that previously when I thought I had meant "+", I had not actually meant quus. Kripke then argues for an interpretation of Wittgenstein as holding that there are no facts about my past behavior or my current state that make it such that it is correct (consistent with my previous intention) to go on using the sign "+" in either the plus-like or quus-like manner.

== See also ==
- Problem of induction
- Solomonoff's theory of inductive inference – an information theory viewpoint
