= Translation (journal) =

Translation studies journal

- Discipline: Translation studies
- Language: English
- Edited by: Siri Nergaard

Publication details
- History: 2011–
- Publisher: St. Jerome Publishing
- Frequency: Biannually

Standard abbreviations
- ISO 4: Translation

Indexing
- ISSN: 2240-0451
- OCLC no.: 955733591

Links
- Online archive

Translation: A Transdisciplinary Journal, was a biannual peer-reviewed academic journal covering translation studies. Established in 2011, it was published by St. Jerome Publishing, Edizioni di Storia e Letteratura, and the San Pellegrino University Foundation. The editor-in-chief was Siri Nergaard. Other members of the founding editorial board were Stefano Arduini, Edwin Gentzler, Valerie Henitiuk, Bob Hodgson, Paul A. Soukup, and Philip Towner.

A collaborative initiative of the Nida School of Translation Studies, this journal collected the ways in which translation transforms the contemporary world. It offered an open space for debate and reflection on post-translation studies, moving beyond towards transdisciplinary discourses on societies which are increasingly hybrid, diasporic, border-crossing, intercultural, multilingual, and global.

Although this journal ceased to be published, it was notable for the coinage of the term "Post-translation studies" and related developments.
