= Macroharmony =

Pitch content

In music analysis, the macroharmony is what comprises the discrete pitch classes within a given (structural) duration of time.

== Definitions ==
There are slightly different definitions of macroharmony in the literature. In general, it may be said to determine pitch content within some duration of a musical composition. Dmitri Tymoczko defined it as "the total collection of notes used over small stretches of time". Neil Newton defined it as "the collection of pitches from which harmonies are sourced". Ciro Scotto wrote that it is "a large harmony that subsumes the individual chords", adding that he used it more specifically to denote pitch-class subsets. Julian Hook related it to the concept of a field of pitch classes, noting that the difference was one of terminology.

=== Tymoczko's Geometry ===
Scotto suggested the term to Tymoczko, who introduced and defined it in A Geometry of Music (2011). Tymoczko sought to discuss "music that is neither classically tonal nor completely atonal" (see chromaticism and nonchord tones). He observed that a macroharmony of between five and eight pitch classes, or a limited macroharmony, typically contributed to a sense of tonality. He included this feature, limited macroharmony, as one among five general (universal) features of "virtually all" music. The others were conjunct melodic motion, acoustic consonance, harmonic consistency, and pitch centricity. He considered their (non-)interaction, relative importance, and mutual reinforcement.

Of macroharmonies specifically, he asked:

- What is the number of pitch classes in a given macroharmony, if fewer than the total chromatic (aggregate)?
- What is the rate at which given macroharmonies change? (Note: Cf. harmonic rhythm.)
- What is the relationship (e.g., transpositional) between given macroharmonies?
- What are the intervallic qualities (consonance or dissonance) of a given macroharmony?

He proposed to show the rate at which pitch classes are used with "pitch-class circulation graphs" and the number and relative proportion of pitch classes on a large scale with "global macroharmonic profiles".

== Relation to scale ==
In general, macroharmony may be understood in some relation to musical scales. Theoretically, the pitch-class content of tonal music may be that of the chromatic scale. Practically, it is often limited to that of modes, especially the major or minor diatonic scales as subsets of the chromatic scale. (Note: In the music of many cultures, the pitch-class content is that of the pentatonic scale.) In a similar way, though scales may in fact constitute the entire pitch-class content of a given tuning system or the macroharmony of some portion of a composition, they are nonetheless defined as subsets of the macroharmony within the context of Tymoczko's project.

== See also ==
- chroma feature or chromagram
- Fred Lerdahl's Cognitive Constraints on Compositional Systems (1988)
- musica ficta
- musical set theory
- musical texture
- musical transformation
- pitch space
- Schenkerian analysis
- simultaneity
