= Irrealism (philosophy) =

Philosophical position first proposed by Nelson Goodman

Irrealism is a philosophical position first advanced by Nelson Goodman in "Ways of Worldmaking", encompassing epistemology, metaphysics, and aesthetics.

== Nelson Goodman's irrealism ==
Irrealism was initially motivated by the debate between phenomenalism and physicalism in epistemology. Rather than viewing either as prior to the other, Goodman described them both as alternative "world-versions", both useful in some circumstances, but neither capable of capturing the other in an entirely satisfactory way, a point he emphasizes with examples from psychology. He goes on to extend this epistemic pluralism to all areas of knowledge, from equivalent formal systems in mathematics (sometimes it is useful to think of points as primitives, sometimes it is more useful to consider lines the primitive) to alternative schools of art (for some paintings thinking in terms of representational accuracy is the most useful way of considering them, for others it is not). However, in line with his consideration of phenomenalism and physicalism, Goodman goes beyond saying merely that these are "world-versions" of the world, instead he describes worlds as "made by making such versions".

Metaphysically, Goodman's irrealism is distinct from anti-realism though the two concepts are frequently confused. "We are not speaking in terms of multiple possible alternatives to a single actual world but of multiple actual worlds." He makes no assertions regarding "the way the world is" and that there is no primary world-version i.e. "no true version compatible with all true versions." As Goodman says, "Not only motion, ... but even reality is relative." It follows that Goodman accepts many forms of realism and anti-realism without being troubled by the resulting contradictions.

== Other irrealists ==
The artist Tristan Tondino writes, "Realism is an Irrealism. Reality is plurality - we partially create it, we must open our universes and our perceptions to all new versions that may promote the concept of human rights and expand its possibilities."

The sociologist Nikolas Rose subscribes to irrealism in his Powers of Freedom, though his irrealism differs from Goodman's in being 'technical, not psychologistic, furthering Goodman's assertions of the human mind are only capable of a limited understanding and that it is a construct built upon itself."

Philosopher Jan Westerhoff discusses irrealism in his paper "The consequences of living in a virtual world generated by our brain"

== Other forms of irrealism ==
The philosophical term may be used in more specific or arguably narrower senses, such as "colour irrealism".

== See also ==
- Anti-realism
- Philosophical realism
- Simulated reality
