= Valerie Henitiuk =

- Henitiuk in 2012
- Born: 1963 (age 62–63)
- Occupations: translator and academic

Valerie Henitiuk (born 1963 in Manning, Alberta) is a scholar researching aspects of the intersection of translation studies, world literature, Inuit literature, Japanese literature, and women's writing. She is a Canadian citizen, recently retired as Vice-president Academic & Provost at Concordia University of Edmonton. Henitiuk has been a visiting scholar at both Harvard and Columbia Universities in the US and at Kokugakuin University in Japan. She was previously executive director of the Centre for the Advancement of Faculty Excellence and Professor of English at Grant MacEwan University in Edmonton, Alberta, on the faculty of the University of East Anglia (UK) and Director of the British Centre for Literary Translation (BCLT).

== Early years ==
Henitiuk was born in Manning, Alberta in 1963, and grew up in various locations in western and northern Canada. An interest in acting led her to participate in a number of drama workshops while in her teens. Following extensive travels in USA and Central America she completed a BA (French + Latin, 1985) and MA (French Translation, 1988), was then employed by the Alberta Government Translation Bureau, and operated a freelance translation business. Ms. Henitiuk subsequently returned to the University of Alberta, obtaining an MA in Japanese Literature in 2000 and a PhD in Comparative Literature in 2005.

== Educational background ==
Henitiuk has a PhD (Comparative Literature) from the University of Alberta. She also holds a Diplôme d'études linguistiques françaises, Université de la Sorbonne-Nouvelle. Her PhD was supported by Killam Prize and Social Sciences and Humanities Research Council (SSHRC) fellowships, the Dorothy J. Killam Memorial Graduate Prize, as well as an award allowing her to spend a year at Kokugakuin University in Japan conducting research (2002–03). Upon the completion of the PhD in 2005 Henitiuk was awarded the prestigious Governor General's Gold Medal as the foremost graduate at the university (all faculties).

In September 2005, Henitiuk began a two-year post-doctoral fellowship at The center (now Institute) for Comparative Literature and Society directed by Gayatri Spivak. Her sponsor was David Damrosch. This research project investigated the process by which national literature becomes world literature. Her fellowship was funded by SSHRC and she was awarded the inaugural SSHRC Postdoctoral Prize.

== Professional background ==
In June 2017 Henitiuk was appointed as Vice-president Academic & Provost at Concordia University of Edmonton, Alberta. From April 2013 to June 2017 Henitiuk was a professor of English and executive director of the Centre for the Advancement of Faculty Excellence (formerly Faculty Commons) at Grant MacEwan University. From March 2007 to March 2013 she was Senior Lecturer in Literature and Translation at the University of East Anglia (UEA) in Norwich, UK and (from August 2011) Director of the BCLT at UEA. Henitiuk previously held posts as acting Director and associate director of the BCLT. From August 2010 to August 2011 she was a visiting scholar at Harvard University funded by a fellowship from the Leverhulme Trust. She specializes in the study of: World Literature, Comparative Literature, Translation Studies, East-West Cultural Exchange, and Women's Writing.

In 2011 Valerie Henitiuk was a founding member of the journal Translation. From 2012 to 2017 she was editor of the Routledge journal Translation Studies. From 2007 to 2011, she was editor of In Other Words: the journal for literary translators and served on the editorial board from 2009 to 2011 for the transdisciplinary journal titled translation. She was also, from 2008 to 2012, on the faculty for the Nida School of Translation Studies, a research symposium held annually in Italy.

Exploratory research funded by a SSHRC Insight Development Grant in 2016 on English and French translations of Inuit Literature led to a multi-year study of the writings of Markoosie Patsauq (1941-2020).

== Published works ==
Together with Marc-Antoine Mahieu (INALCO), and in collaboration with the author, Henitiuk in 2021 brought out the first full critical edition of any Indigenous author in Canada, translating Markoosie Patsauq's 1969-70 Umarjursiutik unaatuinnamut as Hunter with Harpoon/Chasseur au Harpon (2021), which has been described as "one of the most complete and far-reaching critical editions of a text directly uttered-even if in writing-in any North American Native language". Trade editions, featuring a preface by the Inuit leader Mary Simon, have also been released in English as well as in French, for readers in both France and Quebec. Henitiuk and Mahieu have also published on topics such as representing experiential knowledge.

Valerie Henitiuk and Marc-Antonie Mahieu published an article in the academic journal Alternative Francophone discussing Uumajursiutik unaatuinnamut, a work by Inuit author Markoosie Patsauq originally published in Inuktitut in 1969–1970. They explain that the 1970 English version of Harpoon of the Hunter was translated to adapt to the English language norms rather than a direct translation of the original Inuktitut text.

Henitiuk has authored a monograph on liminal imagery in a cross-cultural selection of women's writing and another book, designed to assist in the teaching of translation, looks at some fifty different translations from Japanese of a single passage from The Pillow Book. She has also co-edited two collections of stories by women from India, and a collection of critical essays on W. G. Sebald.

Henitiuk has also published scholarly articles on a variety of subjects including the translation of Inuit literature, women's writing, the introduction of classical Japanese literature into the west, and comparisons between eastern and western texts. Her first major, and most frequently cited, article is "Translating Woman", an analysis of gender translation issues which she has continued to explore during her research. She has also discussed feminist aspects of literature in the context of magic realism. Recent scholarship has concentrated on examinations of the way translations of 10th-century Japanese women's writing has entered the western consciousness and the political/cultural dimensions of translation of such work. Book chapters have analyzed boundary metaphors in Elizabeth Inchbald and rape as a motif in literature. Other chapters discuss gender aspects in The Tale of Genji, The Kagerô Nikki and The Pillow Book of Sei Shônagon.

== Public service ==
Besides her academic work, Henitiuk has been deeply involved in the promotion of literary translation as a professional discipline through a variety of organizations, serving on national and international committees. As well she has been quoted regarding funding cuts to the arts in the UK and Canada, and has made pedagogical contributions.
