= Naphtholphthalein =

- Skeletal formula

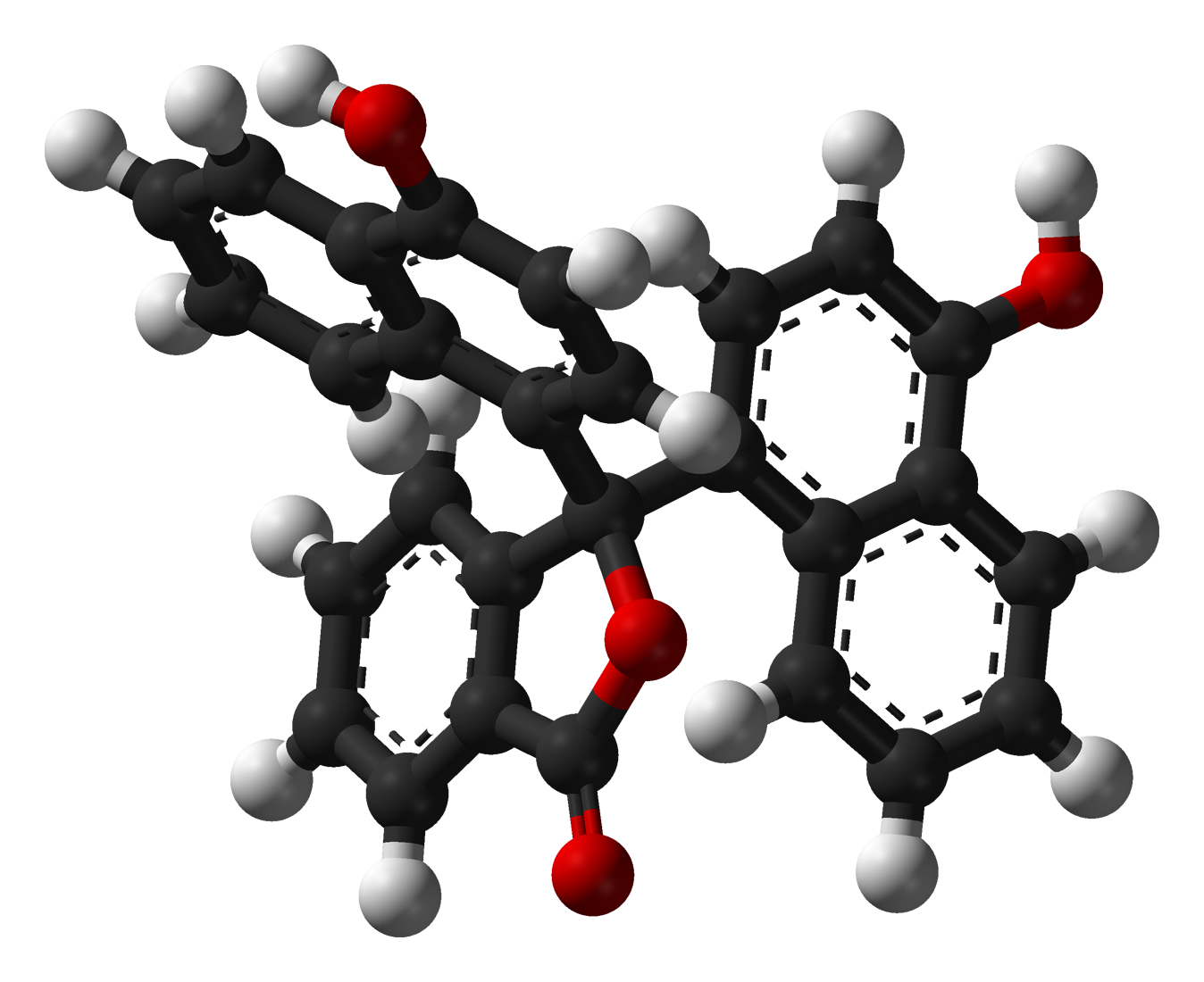
- Ball-and-stick model

Names
- Preferred IUPAC name 3,3-Bis(4-hydroxynaphthalen-1-yl)-2-benzofuran-1(3H)-one
- Other names 1-Naphtholphthalein, alpha-naphtholphthalein, naphtholphthalein blue

Identifiers
CAS Number	596-01-0
3D model (JSmol)	Interactive image
Beilstein Reference	97816
ChemSpider	62215
ECHA InfoCard	100.008.979
EC Number	209-875-5
PubChem CID	68993
UNII	2QEG1706NN
CompTox Dashboard (EPA)	DTXSID70208273
- InChI: InChI=1S/C28H18O4/c29-25-15-13-23(17-7-1-3-9-19(17)25)28(22-12-6-5-11-21(22)27(31)32-28)24-14-16-26(30)20-10-4-2-8-18(20)24/h1-16,29-30H Key: HQHBAGKIEAOSNM-UHFFFAOYSA-N
- SMILES: C1=CC=C2C(=C1)C(=CC=C2O)C3(C4=CC=CC=C4C(=O)O3)C5=CC=C(C6=CC=CC=C65)O

Properties
Chemical formula	C_{28}H_{18}O_{4}
Molar mass	418.448 g·mol^{−1}
Appearance	Colorless-reddish to blue-green solid
Melting point	238–240 °C (460–464 °F; 511–513 K)
Solubility in water	Insoluble

Hazards
- Occupational safety and health (OHS/OSH)
Main hazards	Irritant
- GHS labelling
Pictograms	(GHS07: Exclamation mark)
Signal word	Warning
Hazard statements	H315, H319, H335
Precautionary statements	P261, P305+P351+P338
- Except where otherwise noted, data are given for materials in their standard state (at 25 °C [77 °F], 100 kPa). verify (what is ?) Infobox references

α-Naphtholphthalein (C_{28}H_{18}O_{4}) is a phthalein dye used as a pH indicator with a visual transition from colorless/reddish to greenish blue at pH 7.3–8.7.

Naphtholphthalein (pH indicator)
below pH 7.3		above pH 8.7
(pink) 7.3	⇌	8.7 (blue-green)
