= Herbert G. Bohnert =

American philosopher (1918–1984)

- Born: Herbert Gaylord Bohnert; March 24, 1918
- Died: March 12, 1984

Academic background
- Education: University of Chicago, University of Pennsylvania
- Thesis: The Interpretation of Theory (1961)
- Doctoral advisor: Nelson Goodman

Academic work
- Discipline: Philosophy, logic
- Institutions: Michigan State University

Herbert Gaylord Bohnert (March 24, 1918 – March 12, 1984) was an American analytic philosopher. After obtaining a PhD from the University of Pennsylvania on Ramsey sentences in 1961, Bohnert conducted research on natural language processing at IBM's Thomas J. Watson Research Center and later taught philosophy and logic at Michigan State University. Bohnert was a personal friend of Rudolf Carnap who defended Carnapian views at a time when they had largely fallen out of fashion. For this reason there is renewed interest in Bohnert's work among scholars of the history of analytic philosophy.

== Life and career ==
Bohnert was born in 1918 and studied political science at the University of Chicago, where in 1941 he first attended classes and seminars by the leading logical empiricist Rudolf Carnap. During the 1940s Bohnert decided to pursue a career in philosophy and enrolled in the PhD program at the University of Pennsylvania in 1950 under the supervision of Nelson Goodman. After initially planning to write on dispositions Bohnert changed the topic to Ramsey sentences in the mid-1950s. It took him until 1961 to complete and defend the thesis, partly because his funding was insecure. Bohnert had to take on various jobs, including as a researcher at the RAND Corporation and a programmer in the aviation industry. For most of the 1950s he lived in Los Angeles and frequently met with Carnap, who by then had moved from Chicago for a position at UCLA.

After initially failing to secure an academic position, Bohnert started to work at IBM's Thomas J. Watson Research Center in 1961. There he was engaged in a project on natural language processing called LOGOS: Logical Optimization of Grammar for Organized Systems. After being encouraged by the eminent American philosopher W. V. Quine, Bohnert tried to turn his PhD thesis into a book, but failed to do so and instead published two short articles on Ramsey sentences. In 1969 Bohnert left IBM to take up a position as professor of philosophy at Michigan State University. During his tenure there he published articles related to Carnap's philosophy as well as a textbook on formal logic based on his classes, which was positively received. He also defended Carnap's analytic–synthetic distinction against Quine's famous critique. For reasons of health Bohnert had to take early retirement in 1982 and died two years later.

== Research ==
=== Ramsey sentences ===
Bohnert's research primarily deals with the Ramseyfication of scientific theories. To philosophers of science the status of theoretical terms like "electron" had long seemed problematic, since we are not directly acquainted with electrons in the way we are with ordinary medium-sized physical objects such as stones. Instead, we only know them by descriptions of their functional role inside a scientific theory. The so-called Ramseyfication of a scientific theory captures this difference by eliminating names for theoretical entities and replacing them by general claims about all entities fulfilling a certain description.

In his PhD thesis The Interpretation of Theory, Bohnert draws attention to an important fact about the logical form of Ramseyfied theories. One typically thinks of a scientific theory as a collection of several distinct principles, but in its Ramseyfied form a theory is actually one long monolithic sentence. This, so Bohnert argues, raises the question of how scientists can communicate with each other about individual claims of the theory. In order to solve this problem, Bohnert introduces the notion of a quasi-constant, which functions logically like a proper name but doesn't semantically refer to a specific entity. Sentences including quasi-constants are called clauses, and, according to Bohnert, communication can succeed with their help, since a clause can be asserted by one scientist and then be integrated into the monolithic theory formulation of another scientist. Bohnert furthermore shows that standard definitions of truth, logical consequence, and probability can be extended to clauses.

=== Writings on Carnap ===
Bohnert knew Carnap well and frequently talked and corresponded with him about philosophy. His articles on Carnap from the 1970s contain information on Carnap's views not found elsewhere, which — thanks to a resurgence of interest in Carnap's philosophy since the 1980s — have recently attracted the attention of scholars. Among other things Bohnert discusses Carnap's philosophical methodology, his views on the independence results in set theory, and the learning of natural and constructed languages.

== Selected publications ==
- 1945. "The Semiotic Status of Commands", Philosophy of Science.
- 1961. The Interpretation of Theory, PhD Thesis, University of Pennsylvania.
- 1963. "Carnap's Theory of Definition and Analyticity", The Philosophy of Rudolf Carnap, ed. Paul Arthur Schilpp.
- 1963. "Remarks on Myhill's Remarks on Coordinate Languages", Philosophy of Science.
- 1967. "Communication by Ramsey-Sentence Clause", Philosophy of Science.
- 1968. "In Defense of Ramsey's Elimination Method", Journal of Philosophy.
- 1969. "On Formalized Models of Natural Language", Language and Philosophy: A Symposium, ed. Sidney Hook.
- 1970. "Homage to Rudolf Carnap", PSA: Proceedings of the Biennial Meeting of the Philosophy of Science Association.
- 1974. "The Logico-Linguistic Mind-Brain Problem and a Proposed Step towards Its Solution", Philosophy of Science.
- 1975. "Carnap's Logicism", Rudolf Carnap, Logical Empiricist: Materials and Perspectives, ed. Jaakko Hintikka.
- 1977: Logic: Its Use and Basis, University Press of America, Washington. D.C.
- 1986. "Quine on Analyticity", The Philosophy of W.V. Quine, ed. Lewis Edwin Hahn and Paul Arthur Schilpp.
