= Edwin Gentzler =

American linguist

Edwin Gentzler is a Professor Emeritus of Comparative Literature and former Director of the Translation Center at the University of Massachusetts Amherst.

== Biography ==
Gentzler first obtained his BA in English at Kenyon College, Gambier, Ohio in 1973. From 1974 to 1977, he studied Germanistic at the Free University of Berlin. From 1978 to 1983, Gentzler worked as a translator and administrator at the International Writing Program at the University of Iowa. He obtained his PhD in Comparative Literature in 1990 at the Vanderbilt University, Nashville, Tennessee. He was a guest professor at Utrecht University in Holland and Warwick University in England in the early 1990s. Since 1994 Gentzler has worked at the University of Massachusetts Amherst, Department of Comparative Literature, where he lectured in Translation Technology, Translation Studies, Postcolonial Theory, and Comparative Literature. He also directed the Translation Center, which provides translation services to business, hospitals, and social service agencies in New England. He has translated works of German authors, including Manfred Jendreschik, Axel Schulze, Elke Erb, Sarah Kirsch, Helga Novak, and Eberhard Panitz, into English. He retired in 2017.

He is a founding member of the American Translation and Interpreting Studies Association, served on the Executive Committee of the Nida Institute, and was co-editor (with Susan Bassnett) of the Topics in Translation Series for Multilingual Matters, and also member of the editorial board of Translation.

== Thought ==
Gentzler is the author of Translation and Rewriting in the Age of Post-Translation Studies (Routledge, 2017), Translation and Identity in the Americas (Routledge, 2008), and Contemporary Translation Theories (Routledge, 1993), reissued in revised second edition (Multilingual Matters, 2001) and translated into Italian, Portuguese, Bulgarian, Arabic, Persian, Chinese, and Greek. He is the co-editor (with Maria Tymoczko) of Translation and Power (University of Massachusetts Press, 2002). In his work Contemporary Translation Theories (1993) Gentzler examines modern approaches to translation studies, such as the translation workshop, the science of translation, translation studies, polysystem theory, and deconstruction, all of which began in the mid-1960s and continue to be influential today. He explores the strengths and weaknesses of each method, tracing the connections among the different schools of thought. Illustrating the importance of translation theory to the current debates in cultural studies, Gentzler raises theoretical questions challenging assumptions of the leading translation theories. In Translation and Identity in the Americas, Gentzler looks at the development of translation in Brazil, Latin America, Canada, and the Caribbean, suggesting that translation is integral to cultural construction and identity formation in the Americas. In Translation and Rewriting in the Age of Post-Translation Studies, he argues that texts no longer simply move across borders, but circulate internationally and intersemiotically into multiple languages, media, and forms.

== Works ==
- Translation and Rewriting in the Age of Post-Translation Studies. London: Routledge, 2017.
- Translation and Identity in the Americas: New Directions in Translation Theory. London: Routledge, 2008.
- Translation and Power, co-edited with Maria Tymoczko. Amherst: University of Massachusetts Press, 2002.
- Contemporary Translation Theories, revised 2nd edition. Clevedon: Multilingual Matters, 2001.
- Contemporary Translation Theories. London & New York: Routledge, 1993.
