= Julianna Tymoczko =

American mathematician (born 1975)

Julianna Sophia Tymoczko (born 1975) is an American mathematician whose research connects algebraic geometry and algebraic combinatorics, including representation theory, Schubert calculus, equivariant cohomology, and Hessenberg varieties. She is a professor of mathematics at Smith College.

== Education and career ==
Tymoczko grew up in Western Massachusetts, and studied discrete mathematics at Smith College as a high school student. She was an undergraduate at Harvard University, and wrote a senior thesis on the homotopy groups of spheres, The p-components of the stable homotopy groups of spheres, with Joe Harris and Michael J. Hopkins as faculty mentors. After graduating in 1998, she moved to Princeton University for graduate study, and completed her Ph.D. there in 2003. Her dissertation, Decomposing Hessenberg Varieties over Classical Groups, was supervised by Robert MacPherson.

After being a Clay Liftoff Fellow, NSF Postdoctoral Fellow, and Hildebrandt Assistant Professor at the University of Michigan, she took a tenure-track position at the University of Iowa in 2007. In 2011 she returned to Smith College as a faculty member. She was promoted to full professor in 2019.

== Recognition ==
Tymoczko was elected as a Fellow of the American Mathematical Society in the 2020 class, for "contributions to algebraic geometry and combinatorics, and for outreach and mentorship".

== Personal life ==
Tymoczko is one of three children of Thomas Tymoczko, a logician and philosopher of mathematics at Smith College, and comparative literature scholar Maria Tymoczko of the University of Massachusetts Amherst. Her brother, Dmitri Tymoczko, is a music composer and music theorist. She is married to Marshall Poe, a historian at the University of Massachusetts Amherst.
