= Maria Tymoczko =

American literary scholar

- Born: 1943 (age 82–83)

Academic background
- Education: Radcliffe College; Harvard Graduate School of Arts and Sciences

Academic work
- Discipline: Comparative literature
- Institutions: University of Massachusetts Amherst

Maria Fleming Tymoczko (born 1943) is a scholar of comparative literature who has written about translation, medieval Celtic literature, and modern Irish literature including the works of James Joyce. She is a professor of comparative literature at the University of Massachusetts Amherst, and the former president of the Celtic Studies Association of North America. She is known for her calls for a more international and multicultural perspective on translation.

== Education and career ==
Tymoczko is of Slovak descent through her grandmother, and grew up speaking English, Slovak, and (from neighbors) Italian. She lived in her grandmother's house in Cleveland, Ohio at a time and place where "it was assumed that most people spoke at least two languages", and has said that this upbringing strongly influenced her view of translation.

She earned a bachelor's degree at Radcliffe College in 1965, majoring in Romance languages with a minor in biochemistry. After a year as a Fulbright Scholar at Aix-Marseille University, she returned to Harvard University for graduate study, earning a master's degree in 1968 and completing her Ph.D. in Celtic and Romance languages and literatures in 1973. Her dissertation, The Personal Names in the Ulster Sagas: A Tool for Understanding the Development of the Cycle, was supervised by John V. Kelleher.

After postdoctoral research at the University of Massachusetts Amherst, she became an assistant professor of Irish studies for the Five College Consortium in 1974, and in 1977 moved to the comparative literature department of the University of Massachusetts Amherst, one of the Five Colleges.

== Books ==
Tymoczko's first book, The Irish "Ulysses" (University of California Press, 1994) was co-winner of the 1995 Book Award for Literary and Cultural Criticism from the American Conference for Irish Studies. The book argues that in Ulysses, James Joyce was seeking to create an Irish literature, and teases out many parallel passages from Ulysses to the Irish literary tradition that, according to Tymoczko, were deliberate references by Joyce. Bien (1995) calls some of the comparisons stretched and suggests that many readers will not be convinced, but still calls it "a book that every Joycean must read". And although Harmon (1998) criticizes her style of reasoning, "from like to like", as weak without a comparison of how many other things are also like, he nevertheless says that she "establishes [it] beyond any quibble". Tracy (1995) supports her thesis as unsurprising, pointing to Joyce's later use of Irish texts in Finnegans Wake.

Her next book forms a bridge between this early work on Irish literature and her later work on translation as a general topic. Translation in a Postcolonial Context (St. Jerome Publishing, 1999) won the Michael J. Durkan Prize of the American Conference for Irish Studies for best book in Irish language and cultural studies. It studies multiple 19th- and 20th-century translations of old Irish literature, particularly concentrating on the Táin Bó Cúailnge, and the ways in which these translations were colored by the context of the colonization and decolonization of Ireland. It also expresses a clear preference for literary translation over scholarly translation, as later exemplified by Seamus Heaney's translation of Beowulf.

In her third book, Enlarging Translation, Empowering Translators (St. Jerome Publishing, 2007), Tymoczko clearly articulates her call for a new view of translation bringing greater diversity into its theory and practice. She argues that the view of translation as faithfully transmitting a text's original meaning is only one way of looking at translation, stemming from its origin in the translation of the Bible. Instead, following Gideon Toury, she argues that any text viewed within its culture as a translation should be considered one, that there are many types of translation, that the boundaries of what makes a translation are fuzzy and dynamic, and that viewing translation in this way can help bring a diverse and international viewpoint to the subject.

Tymoczko is also the editor of:

- Born into a World at War (with Nancy Blackmun, 2000; 2nd ed., University of Massachusetts Press, 2015)
- Translation and Power (with Edwin Gentzler, 2002)
- Language and Tradition in Ireland (with Colin Ireland, 2003)
- Translation, Resistance, Activism (University of Massachusetts Press, 2010)
- Translators Writing, Writing Translators (with Françoise Massardier-Kenney and Brian James Baer, Kent State University Press, 2016)

== Personal life ==
Tymoczko was married for many years to philosopher Thomas Tymoczko (1943–1996) of Smith College. They had three children, including music composer and theorist Dmitri Tymoczko and Smith College mathematics professor Julianna Tymoczko.
