= Stefano Arduini =

Italian scholar and professor of linguistics

- Born: 4 December 1956 (age 69); Pesaro, Italy

Academic background
- Education: University of Pisa
- Thesis: Fra cultura e i linguaggio. Un'interpretazione della tipologia di Edward Sapir

Academic work
- Discipline: linguistics
- Sub-discipline: translation studies
- Institutions: Link Campus University
- Notable works: Translation

Stefano Arduini (born 1956) is a scholar of linguistics, rhetoric, semiotics and translation. He is Full Professor of Linguistics at the University of Rome Link Campus where he is the director of the Publishing Professionals Master's degree. He teaches Theory of Translation at the University of Urbino, and is the president of San Pellegrino Unicampus Foundation in Misano Adriatico (Rimini).

== Education ==
In 1984, Arduini obtained a PhD in Linguistics from the University of Pisa with the dissertation Fra cultura e i linguaggio. Un'interpretazione della tipologia di Edward Sapir.

== Teaching ==
He is Senior Advisor to the Nida Institute for Biblical Scholarship in New York and co-director of the Nida School of Translation Studies.

He has been a visiting professor at the University of Alicante and at the Universidad Autónoma de Madrid, and an Honorary Professor at the Universidad Nacional Mayor de San Marcos of Lima (Peru).

== Editorial work ==
Arduini is one of the founders and a member of the Editorial Board of Translation, a journal for translation studies (editor-in-chief: Siri Nergaard). He is a member of the editorial board of the journals Hermeneus (University of Valladolid, Spain) and Tonos, Revista de Estudios Filólogicos (University of Murcia, Spain). He is also on the advisory board of the Quintiliano, Retórica y Comunicación series (University of La Rioja, Spain).

Together with Siri Nergaard he is credited for coining the concept post-translation studies.

== Publications ==
- Sulla conversazione. Una prospettiva integrata di analisi linguistica, Pesaro, Flaminia, 1988.
- Linguistica e scienze del linguaggio, Pesaro, Nobili, 1989. ISBN 88-85162-00-2.
- Il ritorno del testo. Note sulla "Gramatica de la lengua castellana" di Elio Antonio de Nebrija, Pesaro, Nobili, 1990.
- Retorica e traduzione, Urbino 1996.
- (ES) Prolegómenos a una teoría general de las figuras, Murcia, Universidad de Murcia, 2000. ISBN 84-8371-187-7.
- La ragione retorica. Sette studi, Rimini, Guaraldi, 2004. ISBN 88-8049-296-9.
- Manuale di traduzione. Teorie e figure professionali (con Ubaldo Stecconi), Roma, Carocci, 2007. ISBN 978-88-430-3968-5.
- Che cos'è la linguistica cognitiva (con Roberta Fabbri), Roma, Carocci, 2008. ISBN 978-88-430-4716-1.
- Dizionario di retorica, con Matteo Damiani, Covilhã, Livros LabCom, 2010. ISBN 978-989-654-035-7.
- “Translation”, in Andrea Rocci, Louis de Saussure (Rds.) Verbal Communication, Berlin/Boston, De Gruyter 2016: 413-428.
- Con gli occhi dell'altro. Tradurre. Milano, Jaca Book 2020. ISBN 978-88-16-41632-1.

As editor:

- Traduzione e riscrittura (atti dell'omonimo convegno internazionale tenuto a Misano Adriatico il 17-19 settembre 1992), Rimini, Koiné, 1993.
- (EN) Translation and Rewriting, Rimini, Koiné, 1994.
- "Translating Divine Truth – The Translation of Religious Texts", Rimini 1996.
- (EN) Similarity and difference in translation (atti dell'International conference on similarity and translation tenuta alla Bible House di New York il 31 maggio e 1º giugno 2001; con Robert Hodgson Junior), Rimini, Guaraldi, 2004. ISBN 88-8049-228-4.^{[1]} 2ª ed.: Roma, Edizioni di storia e letteratura, 2007. ISBN 978-88-8498-374-9 (il testo è parzialmente consultabile anche su Google Libri). ISBN 978-88-8498-377-0.
- "Metaphors", Roma 2007.
- Le giornate della traduzione letteraria (interventi presentati alle edizioni dal 2003 al 2007 degli omonimi convegni all'Università degli Studi di Urbino; con Ilide Carmignani), Roma, Iacobelli, 2008.
- Le giornate della traduzione letteraria. Nuovi contributi (interventi presentati alle edizioni 2008 e 2009 degli omonimi convegni all'Università degli Studi di Urbino; con Ilide Carmignani), Roma, Iacobelli, 2010.
- (EN) Paradoxes, Roma, Edizioni di storia e letteratura, 2011. ISBN 978-88-6372-309-0.
- Giornate della traduzione letteraria 2010-2011 (interventi presentati alle edizioni 2010 e 2011 degli omonimi convegni all'Università degli Studi di Urbino; con Ilide Carmignani), Roma, Voland, 2012. ISBN 978-88-6243-131-6.
