= Dmitri Tymoczko =

American music theorist and composer (born 1969)

- Born: December 16, 1969 (age 56); Northampton, Massachusetts, US
- Known for: Geometric framework theory of tonality, criticism of David Lewin's formal approach to transformational theory

Academic background
- Education: Harvard University; University of Oxford; University of California, Berkeley

Academic work
- Discipline: Music theory
- Institutions: Princeton University
- Website: dmitri.tymoczko.com

Dmitri Tymoczko (born December 16, 1969) is an American music theorist and composer. As a theorist, he has published more than two dozen articles dealing with topics related to contemporary tonality, including scales, voice leading, and functional harmonic norms. His article "The Geometry of Musical Chords" was the first music-theory article ever published by the journal Science. His music, which draws on rock, jazz, and romanticism, has been performed by ensembles such as the Amernet String Quartet, the Brentano Quartet, Janus, Newspeak, the San Francisco Contemporary Players, the Pacifica Quartet, and pianist Ursula Oppens.

== Early life, family and education ==
Tymoczko was born in 1969, in Northampton, Massachusetts. His father Thomas Tymoczko was a philosopher of mathematics at Smith College, while his mother Maria Tymoczko is a professor of comparative literature at the University of Massachusetts Amherst. His sister, Julianna Tymoczko, became a mathematics professor at Smith. They have a younger brother, Alexei.

He attended Harvard University, studying composition, music theory, and philosophy. He subsequently attended graduate school in philosophy at Oxford University as a Rhodes Scholar. After being asked to leave the philosophy D. Phil. program, he eventually returned to music, acquiring a Ph.D. in composition from The University of California, Berkeley.

== Academic career ==
Since 2002, Tymoczko has been a professor at Princeton University. He is the recipient of fellowships from the Radcliffe Institute of Advanced Study (2005–06) and the John Simon Guggenheim Memorial Foundation (2007).

== Music ==
Tymoczko's album Beat Therapy (Bridge 9353), combines jazz instrumentation with classical ideas of development. The critic Frank Oteri describes it as "far reaching and utterly entertaining."

In Crackpot Hymnal (Bridge 9383), he presents expressly composed chamber pieces inspired and mixed from a number of traditional styles. Jazz, popular, blues and rock styles interact with folk and contemporary classical music.

A third CD, Rube Goldberg Variations was released in 2018. Joshua Kosman, writing at SFGate, called it "whimsical", "ingenious", and with a "rich emotional arc" produced by a "warmth of personality that is distinctive".

== Theoretical work ==
In A Geometry of Music, Tymoczko proposes a general framework for thinking about tonality, arguing that there are five basic features that jointly contribute to the sense of tonality:

- conjunct melodic motion (melodies move by short distances)
- harmonic consistency (harmonies sound similar)
- acoustic consonance (harmonies sound pleasant)
- limited macroharmony (music uses a small number of notes over moderate spans of musical time)
- centricity (one note is heard as "more stable" than the others)

The first part of the book explores theoretical questions about how these properties can be combined. In particular, Tymoczko uses orbifolds to develop "maps" of musical chords, showing that the first two properties (e.g. conjunct melodic motion and harmonic consistency) can be combined only in special circumstances. The second part of the book uses these tools to analyze pieces from the Middle Ages to the present. Tymoczko argues that there is an "extended common practice" linking superficially distinct styles, with jazz being much closer to classical music than many have thought.

Tymoczko showed that nearly even chords (such as those prevalent in Western tonal music) are represented by three main families of lattices. Two of these (Note: A circle of n-dimensional cubes linked by shared vertices, and a circle of n-dimensional cubes linked by shared facets.) are particularly useful in analysis. What results is a systematic perspective on the full family of chord-based graphs.

Tymoczko has written a software program, ChordGeometries, allowing users to visualize the orbifolds representing musical chords. It is available at no charge.

== Personal life ==
Tymoczko is married. He and his wife, philosopher Elisabeth Camp, have two children.

== Selected works ==
Books

- A Geometry of Music. New York: Oxford University Press. 2011.
- Tonality: an owner's manual. New York: Oxford University Press. 2023.

Journal articles

- "The Geometry of Musical Chords". Science. 313 (5783): 72–74. 2006. Bibcode:2006Sci...313...72T. doi:10.1126/science.1126287. PMID 16825563.
- "The Generalized Tonnetz" (PDF). Journal of Music Theory. 56 (1): 1–52. 2012. doi:10.1215/00222909-1546958. Archived from the original (PDF) on April 5, 2025.
- "Submajorization and the Geometry of Unordered Collections" (PDF). The American Mathematical Monthly. 119 (4): 263–283. 2012. doi:10.4169/amer.math.monthly.119.04.263.
- "Geometry and the quest for theoretical generality" (PDF). Journal of Mathematics and Music. 7 (2): 127–144. 2020. doi:10.1080/17459737.2013.818724.
- "Review-Essay on Fred Lerdahl's Composition and Cognition". Music Theory Online. 26 (1). 2020. doi:10.30535/mto.26.1.6.
- "Why topology?" (PDF). Journal of Mathematics and Music: 1–56. 2020. doi:10.1080/17459737.2020.1799563.
- "Hierarchical set theory" (PDF). Journal of Mathematics and Music: 1–9. 2022. doi:10.1080/17459737.2021.2008035.
- "Approximate Set Theory" (PDF). Journal of Music Theory. 67 (1): 1–70. 2023. doi:10.1215/00222909-10232057.
- "It's the Thought That Counts" (PDF). Journal of Music Theory. 68 (1): 125–132. 2024. doi:10.1215/00222909-10974760.
- "Transformations for the twenty-first century" (PDF). Journal of Music Theory. 69 (1): 107–154. 2025. doi:10.1215/00222909-11595227.
- "The Concept of Musical Space" (PDF). Journal of Music Theory. 70 (1): 73–144. 2026. doi:10.1215/00222909-12263030. Archived from the original (PDF) on September 21, 2026.

Music recordings

- Beat Therapy, Bridge Records, 2011.
- Crackpot Hymnal, Bridge Records, 2013.
- Rube Goldberg Variations, Bridge Records 9492, 2017.
- Fools and Angels, Panoramic Recordings, 2018.

== See also ==
- Neo-Riemannian theory
- Pitch space
- Transformational theory
