= Fact, Fiction, and Forecast =

Book by Nelson Goodman

- First edition
- Author: Nelson Goodman
- Language: English
- Subject: Induction and conditionals; New Riddle of Induction
- Genre: Philosophy
- Publisher: Harvard University Press
- Publication date: 1955
- Publication place: Cambridge, Massachusetts
- Media type: Print
- Pages: 126
- ISBN: 978-0-674-29071-6
- OCLC: 655427717

Fact, Fiction, and Forecast (1955) is a book by Nelson Goodman in which he explores some problems regarding scientific law and counterfactual conditionals and presents his New Riddle of Induction. Hilary Putnam describes the book as "one of the few books that every serious student of philosophy in our time has to have read." According to Jerry Fodor, "it changed, probably permanently, the way we think about the problem of induction, and hence about a constellation of related problems like learning and the nature of rational decision." Noam Chomsky and Hilary Putnam attended some of the lectures on which the book is based as undergraduate students at the University of Pennsylvania, leading to a lifelong debate between the two over the question of whether the problems presented in the book imply that there must be an innate ordering of hypotheses.
