= Thomas Tymoczko =

American philosopher and mathematician (1943–1996)

A. Thomas Tymoczko (September 1, 1943 – August 8, 1996) was a philosopher specializing in logic and the philosophy of mathematics. He taught at Smith College in Northampton, Massachusetts, from 1971 until his death in 1996, aged 52.

His publications include New Directions in the Philosophy of Mathematics, an edited collection of essays for which he wrote individual introductions, and Sweet Reason: A Field Guide to Modern Logic, co-authored by Jim Henle. In addition, he published a number of philosophical articles, such as "The Four-Color Problem and its Philosophical Significance", which argues that the increasing use of computers is changing the nature of mathematical proof.

He is considered a member of the fallibilist school in philosophy of mathematics. Philip Kitcher dubbed this school the "maverick" tradition in the philosophy of mathematics. (Paul Ernest)

He completed an undergraduate degree from Harvard University in 1965, and his PhD from the same university in 1972.

== Personal life ==
Tymoczko was married to comparative literature scholar Maria Tymoczko of the University of Massachusetts Amherst. Their three children include composer and music theorist Dmitri Tymoczko and Smith College mathematics professor Julianna Tymoczko.
