= Henrik Gottlieb =

Danish linguist and translation scholar

Henrik Gottlieb is a Danish linguist and translation scholar, who is most known for his work in audiovisual translation. He is an associate professor emeritus at the University of Copenhagen.

== Education and career ==
Gottlieb was born in Copenhagen, Denmark, in 1953. After finishing school in 1971, he worked as a subtitler for Danish public service broadcaster Danmarks Radio and TV 2 (Denmark) in the 1980s and 1990s. He later enlisted at University of Copenhagen from where he got his MA in 1991, with a thesis titled Tekstning - Synkron billedmedieoversættelse (Subtitling - Synchronous Screen Translation). He went on to work as a research assistant and research fellow at the same university, and received his PhD in 1998 with a dissertation titled Subtitles, Translation & Idioms. Gottlieb continued working at the University of Copenhagen after completing the PhD. He was promoted to associate professor in 2000, and in 2021 he defended his monograph Echoes of English and became Dr.Phil. in Anglicisms. He retired in 2022, yet remains active within academia. Even though he pursued an academic career, he still kept in contact with the world of broadcasting, working as a research consultant at the TV International subtitling department of Danmarks Radio in Copenhagen.

== Work ==
Gottlieb was editor in chief of Perspectives: Studies in Translation Theory and Practice from 2006 until 2011, and is still on the editorial board of that journal. He is a founding member of ESIST, the European Association for Studies in Screen Translation along with Jan Ivarsson and others. Among his more influential works in audiovisual translation is the aforementioned Subtitles, Translation & Idioms and also Screen Translation: Eight Studies in Subtitling, Dubbing and Voice-Over.

== Selected works ==
- Gottlieb, Henrik. 1991. Tekstning - Synkron billedmedieoversættelse. University of Copenhagen: Centre for Translation Studies
- Gottlieb, Henrik. 1997. Subtitles, Translation & Idioms. University of Copenhagen: Centre for Translation Studies
- Gottlieb, Henrik. 2003. Screen Translation: Eight Studies in Subtitling, Dubbing and Voice-Over. University of Copenhagen: Centre for Translation Studies
- Gottlieb, Henrik. 2020. Echoes of English: Anglicisms in Minor Speech Communities – With Special Focus on Danish and Afrikaans. Peter Lang Gmbh.
