= José Ortega Torres =

Spanish poet (1943–2025)

- Born: 1943; Granada, Spain
- Died: 29 November 2025 (aged 82)
- Occupation: Professor
- Writing career
- Pen name: Narzeo Antino, Aldo Fresno
- Period: 20th–21st Century
- Genre: Poetry
- Literary movement: Generación de los 70

José Ortega Torres (1943 – 29 November 2025) was a Spanish poet and an author in the Andalusian poetic scene. A contemporary of the Novísimos poetic movement, his work follows more traditional forms (rhyme, sonnet), with a marked rhythm and deliberate word choice that bring to mind the classical Mediterranean tradition. His biography sheds light on the local history of poetry in the city of Granada.

== Life and career ==
Ortega Torres was born in Granada, Spain in 1943. He majored in Romance Philology at the University of Granada between 1966 and 1969 and in 1971 read his dissertation "Aproximación a la poesía de Rafael Guillén" (Approach to the poetry of Rafael Guillén), under the supervision of Professor Emilio Orozco Díaz. In 1975, he founded with poets José Lupiáñez (La Línea de la Concepción) and José Gutiérrez (Granada) the Silene literary collection, which since then has published works by many local poets (among others, Juan de Loxa, José Rienda, Elena Martín Vivaldi and Carmelo Sánchez Muros). He obtained his Ph.D. in Spanish Philology in 1971 with the work "La poesía de Rafael Guillén: lengua, temas y estilo" (Rafael Guillén's Poetry - Language, Subjects and Style).

During the 1990s and 2000s, he taught Spanish Literature at the Faculty of Translation and Interpreting of the University of Granada.

Ortega Torres used the anagram Narzeo Antino. He died from injuries sustained in a fire on 29 November 2025, at the age of 82.

== Quotes ==
Aynadamar el recinto
del amor. Y tu presencia
claro fulgor: inminencia
alza el afán nunca extinto.
Conjunto de laberinto
entreteje la colina
(sabio secreto de mina
tanta riqueza procura).
Huésped tú de la hermosura
donde la ofrenda culmina.

'Diamante', Granada, 1978, p. 34.

La arquitectura del amor
exalta júbilo en asedio:
por la celosía del alba
se impacientaban los luceros.

Entre los rumores del bosque
-vigilante el desasosiego-
la madrugada rinde espigas
ante el azar del desconcierto.

Mas no ceda el ánimo al frío
frente a la inmolación del tiempo,

no sea que las azucenas
se desvanezcan en el tiempo.

— 'Fulgor de la materia',
Granada, 2003, p. 50 y 51.
Translation:

Amor exaltación y arquitectura
asedio de corceles surtidores
combate desvelando en los fulgores
las columnas del alba y su tersura

Espejo sin sosiego en que perdura
el bosque de los ávidos rumores
apogeo de espigas y atanores
donde la noche rinde su aventura

Amor si tu presencia es desafío
corporal y desnudo pensamiento

concédeme el clamor de las almenas
desvanece fugaz las azucenas

== Works and prizes ==
- Cauce vivo ("A Live Riverbed"), 1971, signed as Aldo Fresno
- Ceremonia salvaje ("A Wild Ceremony"), 1973
- Carmen de Aynadamar ("The Carmen of Aynadamar"), 1974
- Ritos y cenizas ("Rites and Ashes"), 1975
- "Poema de la Alhambra, de A.E.” (published in the Granada journal Ideal on 23 February 1975)
- El exilio y el reino ("The Exile and the Kingdom"), 1979
- Hierofanía ("Hierophany", 1981), Federico García Lorca Prize in 1979 (sponsored by the University of Granada).
- La diadema y el cetro: himno ("The Diadem and the Sceptre - a Hymn"), 1983
- Diamante: (espacio íntimo) (Diamond: an intimate space"), 1987
- Olvido es el mar, ("The Sea is Oblivion"), 1989
- Domus aurea ("Domus Aurea", 1996), Provincia de León Prize, 1994.
- Laurel & glosa, ("A Laurel and a Note"), 1997
- Centinela del aire ("The Sentinel of the Air"), 1999, Ciudad de Salamanca Prize.
- Amante desafío ("A Loving Challenge"), 2001
- Fulgor de la materia ("The Splendor of the Matter"), 2003
- Un título para Eros. Erotismo, sensualidad y sexualidad en la literatura ("A Title for Eros. Erotism, Sensuality and Sexuality in Literature"), Chapter 7 - “Falomanía y travesura en El jardín de Venus de Samaniego” ("Fallomania and Play in Samaniego's Garden of Venus")
