= AVT =

AVT may refer to:

- Advanced volatile threat, cyberattack not requiring file on hard drive
- Alijah Vera-Tucker, American football player
- Arginine vasotocin, a hormone
- Asociación de Víctimas del Terrorismo (Association of Victims of Terrorism), Spain
- Audiovisual translation, a specialized branch of translation
- Avnet, American electronics company (NASDAQ stock symbol AVT)
- AVT Statistical filtering algorithm
- Two US Navy hull classification symbols: Aircraft transport (AVT) and Auxiliary aircraft landing training ship (AVT)
