= Mary Carroll (translator) =

Australian translator

Mary Carroll is an Australian translation specialist working in audiovisual translation. In 2012, she received the Jan Ivarsson Award for services to the field of audiovisual translation.

She was Managing Director of Titelbild Subtitling and Translation GmbH, Berlin from 1991 until 2011. She also works as a consultant and teacher in the field of translation and subtitling. Between 2013 and 2017, she worked as Executive Director at MiKK, a non-governmental organization specializing in mediation in cases of international abductions and detention of children.

Today, Carroll mainly researches audiovisual translation as well as bilingual mediation and interpretation. In 2013 she was involved in launching the international conference series InDialog.

She published Subtitling (Transedit, 1998) with Jan Ivarsson.

Carroll is a member of the European Association for Studies in Screen Translation (ESIST), the German Federal Association of Interpreters and Translators (BDÜ), the Committee for the International Conference Languages and the Media, and the Transmedia Research Group. She also holds a Master's Degree in Mediation and Conflict Management .
