= Anthony Pym =

Australian translation scholar (born 1956)

- Born: 1956 (age 69–70); Perth, Australia
- Citizenship: Australian, French

Academic background
- Education: Murdoch University (BA); École des Hautes Études en Sciences Sociales (PhD)

Academic work
- Discipline: Translation studies
- Institutions: Rovira i Virgili University; Stellenbosch University; The University of Melbourne

Anthony David Pym (born 1956 in Perth, Australia) is a scholar best known for his work in translation studies.

Pym is Distinguished Professor of Translation and Intercultural Studies at Rovira i Virgili University in Spain, Professor Extraordinary at Stellenbosch University in South Africa, and Honorary Research Fellow at the University of Melbourne in Australia. He was a fellow of the Catalan Institution for Research and Advanced Studies from 2010 to 2015, Visiting Researcher at the Middlebury Institute of International Studies at Monterey from 2008 to 2016, Walter Benjamin Visiting Professor at the University of Vienna in 2015, and President of the European Society for Translation Studies from 2010 to 2016.

== Biography ==
Pym attended Wesley College (Perth, Australia) and the University of Western Australia, completing his BA (Hons) at Murdoch University in 1981. He held a French government grant for doctoral studies at the École des Hautes Études en Sciences Sociales, where he completed his PhD in sociology in 1985. In 1983–84 he was a Frank Knox Fellow in the Department of Comparative Literature at Harvard University. In 1992–94 he held a post-doctoral grant from the Alexander von Humboldt Foundation for research on translation history at the University of Göttingen, Germany. In 1994 he gave seminars on the ethics of translation at the Collège International de Philosophie, Paris.

After years as a professional translator, journal editor and organizer of cultural events in France and Spain, he taught in the translation departments of the Autonomous University of Barcelona and the University of Las Palmas de Gran Canaria. In 1994 he joined the Rovira i Virgili University in Tarragona, Spain, where he set up the Intercultural Studies Group in 2000, postgraduate programs in translation in 2000, and a doctoral program in 2003. He has been a Visiting Researcher at the Monterey Institute of International Studies since 2006. His permanent residence is in the village of Calaceite, Spain.

Pym is Distinguished Professor of Translation and Intercultural Studies and coordinator of the Intercultural Studies Group at the Rovira i Virgili University in Tarragona, Spain where he also ran a doctoral program. In addition, Pym is Professor Extraordinary at Stellenbosch University and an international advisory board member for the Translation and Inter-Cultural Research Cluster at the University of Western Australia.

Pym was a visiting professor at the Middlebury Institute of International Studies at Monterey from 2008 to 2016, where he conducted research and lectures. From 2010 to 2015, he was a fellow of the Catalan Institution for Research and Advanced Studies. He was also President of the European Society for Translation Studies from 2010 to 2016 and Walter Benjamin Visiting Professor at the University of Vienna in 2015. In 2017, he joined the University of Melbourne's School of Languages and Linguistics.

== Thought and influence ==
Pym was one of the first to move the study of translation away from texts and toward translators as people. He argued that translators are “authors” who can select the thoughts and emotions to express rather than “animators,” who merely present other's words. He views the translator as working with the author to create meaning, therefore, they both contribute to the meaning of the translation

According to him, the development of the translation field in the West has been essentially a "history of translation theory", a limitation that he proposed to address by focusing on the translators themselves and the contexts in which they operate.

Pym also conceptualized translating as a form of risk management, rather than a striving for equivalence. According to Pym there are three types and levels of risks: credibility risk, uncertainty risk, and communicative risk. Credibility risk concerns the specificity of translation and relations between people, where the risk is the probability of the translator losing credibility. Uncertainty risk involves a translator's cognitive processes when they are uncertain about how to present something. Communicative risk involves the possible loss of cooperation between the participants in the communication act.

Pym has hypothesized that translators can be members of professional intercultures, operating in the overlaps of cultures, and that their highest ethical goal is the promotion of long-term cross-cultural co-operation. Pym has stressed that the translators' loyalty should also be in their profession and that the value of translation efforts lies in its contribution to intercultural relations and cross-cultural communication.

Pym has been attracted to the concept of inculturation, through which he sees translation as one of the ways minority cultures are absorbed into wider cultural systems and can then modify those wider systems. Pym has also cited the role of technology, particularly the Internet in the translation of materials tailored to a specific local market. According to him, the proliferation of information does not necessarily mean that these will be received, hence, care should be taken so that the translated texts appeal to its target culture.

Pym's ideas have been contrasted with those of the American translation theorist Lawrence Venuti by the Finnish translation scholar Kaisa Koskinen, and Pym's critique of Lawrence Venuti has been commented on by Jeremy Munday, and Mary Snell-Hornby

== Works ==
Pym has authored, co-authored, and edited over 30 books and 270 articles about translation and intercultural relations:

- Translation and Text Transfer. An Essay on the Principles of Intercultural Communication, Frankfurt/Main: Peter Lang, 1992. Revised edition: Tarragona: Intercultural Studies Group, 2010.
- Epistemological Problems in Translation and its Teaching, Calaceite: Caminade, 1993.
- Pour une éthique du traducteur, Arras: Artois Presses Université / Ottawa: Presses de l’Université d’Ottawa, 1997.
- Method in Translation History, Manchester: St Jerome Publishing, 1998. Reprint with Chinese introduction: 北京 : 外语敎学与硏究出版社, Beijing, 2006.
- Negotiating the Frontier: Translators and Intercultures in Hispanic History, Manchester: St Jerome Publishing, 2000.
- The Moving Text: Localization, Translation and Distribution, Amsterdam & Philadelphia: John Benjamins, 2004.
- Exploring Translation Theories, London and New York: Routledge, 2010. Japanese translation, 翻訳理論の探求, trans. Kayoko Takeda, Tokyo: Misuzu Shobo, 2010. Translation rights sold for Portuguese and Korean.
- The status of the translation profession in the European Union, with François Grin, Claudio Sfreddo, Andy L. J. Chan. Luxembourg: European Commission, 2012.
- On Translator Ethics. Principles for Cross-cultural communication. Amsterdam and Philadelphia: John Benjamins, 2012 (reworked version of Pour une éthique du traducteur).
- Translation and Language Learning, with Kirsten Malmkjaer and Mar Gutiérrez. Luxembourg: European Commission, 2013.
- Translation Solutions for Many Languages. Histories of a Flawed Dream. London: Bloomsbury, 2016.
- What is Translation History? A Trust-Based Approach, with Andrea Rizzi and Birgit Lang. London: Palgrave, 2019.
- How to Augment Language Skills. Generative AI and Machine Translation in Language Learning and Translator Training, with Yu Hao. London and New York: Routledge, 2025.
- Risk Management in Translation, Cambridge: Cambridge University Press, 2025.

=== Translations of Anthony Pym's Works ===
- Exploring Translation Theories (London and New York; Routledge, 2010). Revised edition: Routledge, 2014. Japanese translation, Kayoko Takeda, trans. Tokyo: Misuzu Shobo, 2010. Spanish translation, Teorías contemporáneas de la traducción. Materiales para un curso universitario, Tarragona: Intercultural Studies Group, 2012; unauthorized publication: Havanna: Editorial Arte y Literatura, 2016; second edition 2016. Portuguese translation, Teorias Contemporâneas da Tradução, Lisbon: Fundação Calouste Gulbenkian, 2013. Traditional Chinese translation 探索翻譯理論 第二版, Taipei: Bookman, 2016. Brazilian Portuguese, trans. Rodrigo Borges de Faveri, Explorando as teorias da tradução, Sao Paulo: Perspectiva, 2017. Russian trans. Теоретические парадигмы в переводоведении. Saint Petersburg: Saint Petersburg University Press, 2018. Collective Turkish translation as Çeviri Kuramlarını Keşfetmek, Istanbul: Everest, 2023. French translation by Hélène Jaccomard, Explorations des théories de la traduction, Tarragona: Intercultural Studies Group. 2024, https://doi.org/10.17613/5e5b-kd90. Translation rights sold for Korean and Arabic.
- Method in Translation History (London and New York: Routledge, 2014). Reprint with Chinese introduction: 北京 : 外语敎学与硏究出版社, Beijing, 2006. Arabic translation by Ali Kalfat: المنهج في تاريخ الترجمة, Cairo: National Center for Translation, 2010.
- On translator ethics. Principles for mediation between cultures. Amsterdam and Philadelphia: John Benjamins, 2012. Translation and rewrite of Pour une éthique du traducteur. Korean translation as 번역가 윤리: 문화 간의 중재 원칙 by Hyo-Eun Choi and Hye-Kyung Park, Seoul: Hankuk University of Foreign Studies Press, 2016; Persian translation اصول اخلاقی مترجم by Zahra Fallah Shahroudi and Farzaneh Me'mar, Teheran: Nashr-e Markaz, 2017.
- Text Transfer, Translation History and Translator Ethics — Anthony Pym’s Translation Studies（安东尼•皮姆的翻译研究之迁移•译史•伦理 by Wang Jun, Social Science in China Press, 2023.
