= José Miguel González =

José Miguel González may refer to:

- Míchel (footballer, born 1963) (José Miguel González Martín), Spanish retired footballer
- José Miguel Camacho González (born 1951), Spanish ophthalmologist, medical director, and pioneer on intraocular lens
- Josemi (José Miguel González Rey, born 1979), Spanish footballer
