= European Association for Studies in Screen Translation =

The European Association for Studies in Screen Translation (ESIST) is an international association in the field of audiovisual translation. According to ESIST, screen translation includes all forms of language transfer in the media, including subtitling, dubbing, voice-over, interpreting for the media, surtitling, subtitling for viewers who are deaf or hard of hearing, and audio description for blind and partially sighted audiences.

== History ==
ESIST was founded in March 1995 in Cardiff by a group of professionals and academics from fifteen European universities to establish communication with creators, translators, distributors, and scholars working in the area of European audiovisual broadcasting and multimedia production.

ESIST has been active in promoting European cooperation in audiovisual translation training and the standardization of subtitling practices at a European level. In 2000 it launched The Comparative Subtitling project, the first comparative analysis of subtitling practices and guidelines in all European countries.

In 1998, ESIST endorsed the Code of Good Subtitling Practice. The Code is a set of guidelines developed by Jan Ivarsson and Mary Carroll, which has emerged as a recognized standard in the profession.

In 2010, ESIST signed a protocol of understanding with the European Society for Translation Studies (EST) to enable knowledge exchange in the field of audiovisual translation.

In 2018, the inaugural issue of Journal of Audiovisual Translation was published by ESIST, and new issues are published at a rate of at least two a year. This open-access, peer-reviewed journal is the first academic international journal dedicated to audiovisual translation studies and media accessibility.

== Jan Ivarsson Award ==
Since 2010, ESIST has presented the Jan Ivarsson Award for invaluable services to the field of audiovisual translation. The award is given biannually at the Languages & the Media conference in Berlin.

The award has been presented to:

- 2010: Jan Ivarsson
- 2012: Mary Carroll
- 2014: Jorge Díaz Cintas (University College London)
- 2016: Yves Gambier (University of Turku)
- 2018: Aline Remael (University of Antwerp)
- 2020: Frederic Chaume Varela (Universitat Jaume I)
- 2022: Agnieszka Szarkowska (University of Warsaw)
- 2024: Elena Di Giovanni (Università di Macerata)

== See also ==
- Translation studies
- Multimedia translation
- Subtitles
