= Aline Remael =

Belgian translation scholar

Aline Remael is a Belgian translation scholar, best known for her work in audiovisual translation and media accessibility. Her impact in her chosen field is profound and she has been awarded the Jan Ivarsson Award for her services to screen translation.

== Biography ==
After working as a teacher and a freelance translator and interpreter, Remael spent most of her active career as a translation scholar at the University of Antwerp, and was in 2018 rewarded with the Jan Ivarsson Award for invaluable services to the field of audiovisual translation. Since her retirement, she is emeritus Professor of Translation Theory, Interpreting and Audiovisual Translation/Media Accessibility at the Department of Applied Linguistics/Translators and Interpreters of the University of Antwerp. She is one of the founding members of the TransMedia Research Group.

== Research and impact ==
Remael has published widely in the joint fields of audiovisual translation and media accessibility. She has several publications on subtitling, audio description, and other topics within these fields. She has also co-edited several volumes on audiovisual translation and media accessibility, including Media for All 1: Subtitling for the Deaf, Audio Description and Sign Language (2007) and Media for All 3. AVT and Media Accessibility at the Crossroads (2012). Even though Remael has published widely, she is probably best known to most translation students for her textbooks on subtitling, which she co-authored with Jorge Díaz Cintas. The first one, Audiovisual Translation: Subtitling appeared in 2007 and has been the standard textbook for subtitling courses in universities all over the world. It was superseded in 2021 by their new co-publication Subtitling: Concepts and Practices.

== Selected publications ==
- Remael, Aline. 2003. “Mainstream Narrative Film Dialogue and Subtitling: A Case Study of Mike Leigh's ‘Secrets and Lies (1996)”. In The Translator, 2003, 9, 2 nov, pp. 225 – 247
- Diaz Cintas, Jorge, Pilar Orero & Aline Remael. 2007 Media for all: subtitling for the deaf, audio description, and sign language. Amsterdam & New York: Rodopi. ISBN 978-94-012-0956-4
- Remael, Aline & Gert Vercauteren. 2010. “The translation of recorded audio description from English into Dutch”, Perspectives: Studies in Translatology, 18: 3, 155 — 171
- Remael, Aline, Pilar Orero & Mary Carroll. 2012. Media for All 3. AVT and Media Accessibility at the Crossroads. Leiden: Brill ISBN 978-90-420-3505-8
- Díaz Cintas, Jorge & Aline Remael. 2007. Audiovisual Translation: Subtitling. Manchester: St. Jerome. ISBN 9781900650953
- Díaz Cintas, Jorge & Aline Remael. 2021. Subtitling: Concepts and Practices. London: Routledge. ISBN 9781138940543
