= International Doctorate in Translation Studies =

The International Doctorate in Translation Studies (ID-TS) is a worldwide network of doctoral Translation Studies programs and doctoral programs that include a Translation Studies component.

== History ==
The International Doctorate in Translation Studies was initiated by the European Society for Translation Studies (EST) and organized by the TS-Doc working group and the ID-TS committee.

It was officially launched in Vienna on September 19, 2017.

== Aims ==
The International Doctorate in Translation Studies seeks to promote doctoral programs all over the world based on the conviction that they are a major means of advancing scholarship in the discipline. Translation research is regarded as a broad field encompassing translation, interpreting, audiovisual translation, localization and adaptation.

The network's agenda appears on its Foundation Document. The document outlines the objectives of a doctoral program in Translation Studies and the activities required so that students in these programs can acquire the necessary competences. Its aims include the following: promoting the cooperation between existing doctoral programs; developing a database of online course materials such as model syllabi, presentations and video lectures; providing training for supervisors; compiling a list of translation scholars willing to supervise and co-supervise PhDs in their fields of expertise; facilitating joint doctorates, especially those involving different countries; assisting students whose research work necessitates travelling to other countries; organizing ID-TS students' conferences; tightening the collaboration with the industry and governmental and non-governmental institutions; raising external funding for the activities of the network.

== Member Institutions ==
In 2024, there are 17 members which represent doctoral programs from 12 countries: University of Graz and University of Vienna (Austria), University of Antwerp and KU Leuven (Belgium), University of Bristol and University of Leeds (Britain), Charles University – Prague (Czech Republic), University of Eastern Finland, Tampere University (Finland) and University of Turku (Finland), Johannes Gutenberg University (Germany), Bar-Ilan University (Israel), University of Bologna (Italy), University of Ljubljana (Slovenia), Universitat Rovira i Virgili (Spain), University of Geneva (Switzerland), Boğaziçi University (Turkey). New members are accepted tri-annually based on submitting an application dossier which testifies to the quality of their programs.

== See also ==
- European Society for Translation Studies
- Translation Studies
