= Ana M. Sanchez =

Spanish microscopist

Ana Sanchez
- Education: University of Cadiz; University of Granada
- Scientific career
- Workplaces: University of Liverpool; Centre National de la Recherche Scientifique

Ana M. Sanchez is a Spanish microscopist who is a professor at the University of Warwick. She works on the development of electron microscopy for the advanced characterisation of materials.

== Early life and education ==
Sanchez studied chemical sciences at the University of Granada. Sanchez studied gallium nitride heteroepitaxial systems for her doctoral research at the University of Cádiz. She stayed at the University of Cádiz as an assistant professor for four years, before moving to the French National Centre for Scientific Research as a postdoctoral researcher in 2002. In 2003, she moved to the University of Liverpool, where she worked as a research fellow in materials science.

== Research and career ==
Sanchez works on advanced electron microscopy for condensed matter physics. She joined the University of Warwick in 2009, where she was a Science City Senior Research Fellow. At Warwick, she developed new strategies for semiconductor nanostructures; including functional oxides, 2D materials and van de Waals crystals. She has studied the interface between ferro-electric and ferro-magnetic materials, showing that there was a special texture in ferroelectrics that matches the spin crystal phase of ferromagnets. She showed that at the nanoscale ferromagnetic and ferroelectric materials had almost identical properties.

== Selected publications ==
- Chunming Huang; Sanfeng Wu; Ana M. Sanchez; et al. (24 August 2014). "Lateral heterojunctions within monolayer MoSe2-WSe2 semiconductors". Nature Materials. 13 (12): 1096–1101. doi:10.1038/nmat4064. ISSN 1476-1122. PMID 25150560. Wikidata Q59484213.
- Pedro L. Galindo; Sławomir Kret; Ana M. Sanchez; et al. (22 February 2007). "The Peak Pairs algorithm for strain mapping from HRTEM images". Ultramicroscopy. 107 (12): 1186–1193. doi:10.1016/j.ultramic.2007.01.019. ISSN 0304-3991. PMID 17391848. Wikidata Q51918775.
- E Calleja; M.A Sánchez-Garcı́a; F.J Sánchez; et al. (May 1999). "Growth of III-nitrides on Si(111) by molecular beam epitaxy Doping, optical, and electrical properties". Journal of Crystal Growth. 201–202: 296–317. Bibcode:1999JCrGr.201..296C. doi:10.1016/s0022-0248(98)01346-3. ISSN 0022-0248. Wikidata Q62526059.
