= Ariel Montalbán =

Spanish cartoonist and illustrator

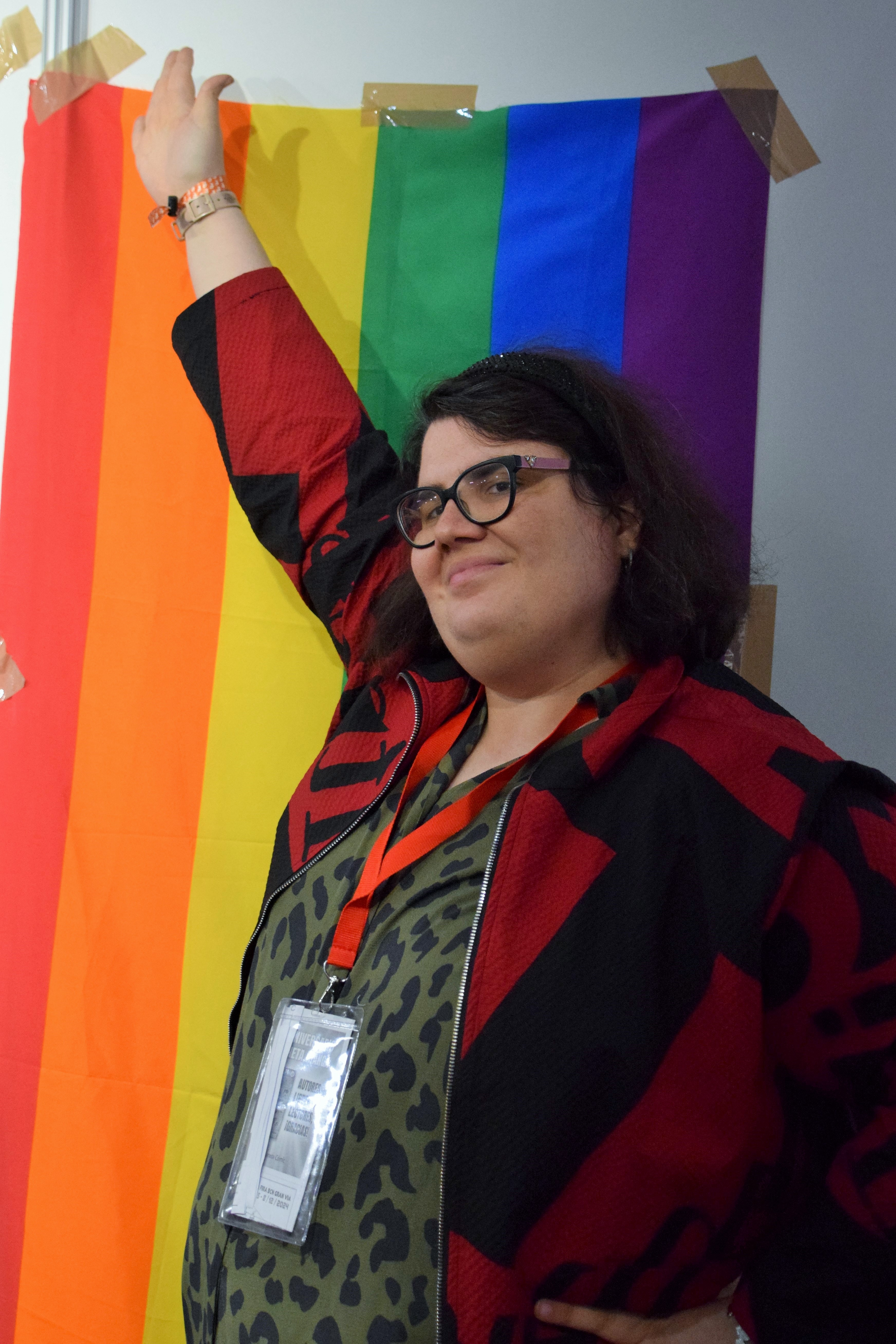
Ariel Montalbán, 2024

Ariel Montalbán Andreo, also known by her pseudonym Ariko (born March 1, 1992), is a Spanish illustrator, comic artist, and fanzine author.

== Education ==
Ariel Montalbán began her artistic education at the Jose Ibáñez Martin Institute in Lorca. She then started her Fine Arts degree in Murcia, which she later completed at the Faculty of Fine Arts in University of Granada.

== Career ==
In 2019, she created the fanzine Transition, which she presented as her final project for her Fine Arts degree.

In 2021, she won the Best Fanzine award at Manga Barcelona for her work Transition, with contributions from RoosArtwork, Kiki Keewan, Pinkcrowberry, and Violent Mantis.

In 2024, she published the fanzine Furry Guide for Losers in collaboration with Chilean author César Bigstar. The 28-page publication is printed in black and white and features only characters from the furry fandom.

In May, she presented her talk The Fanzine Saved My Life: History and Support from the Trans Female Community at the Valencia Comic Conference, highlighting the work of trans women in comics and fanzines, especially within the Spanish industry.

In June of that year, her work Cosplay received an honorable mention in the 24th Nou Barris Comic Contest in Barcelona in the category of Best LGBT Comic.

== Works ==
- Flama Fanzine #1–5 (Anthology)
- Underspain (2016, Anthology)
- Pokemon Let's Zine (2018, Anthology)
- Transition #1–5 (2019–2025, Anthology)
- One Shot Jam #1–4 (2021–2024, Anthology)
- Guía Furry para Pringados (March 4, 2024, with César Bigstar)
- Conviértete en samurái (October 3, 2024, with Jairo Coronado and Leti Moregal)
