= Facultad de Traducción e Interpretación de Granada =

School of the University of Granada

Coordinates: 37°10′32″N 3°36′13″W

Faculty of Translation and Interpreting of the University of Granada
- Facultad de Traducción e Interpretación de Granada
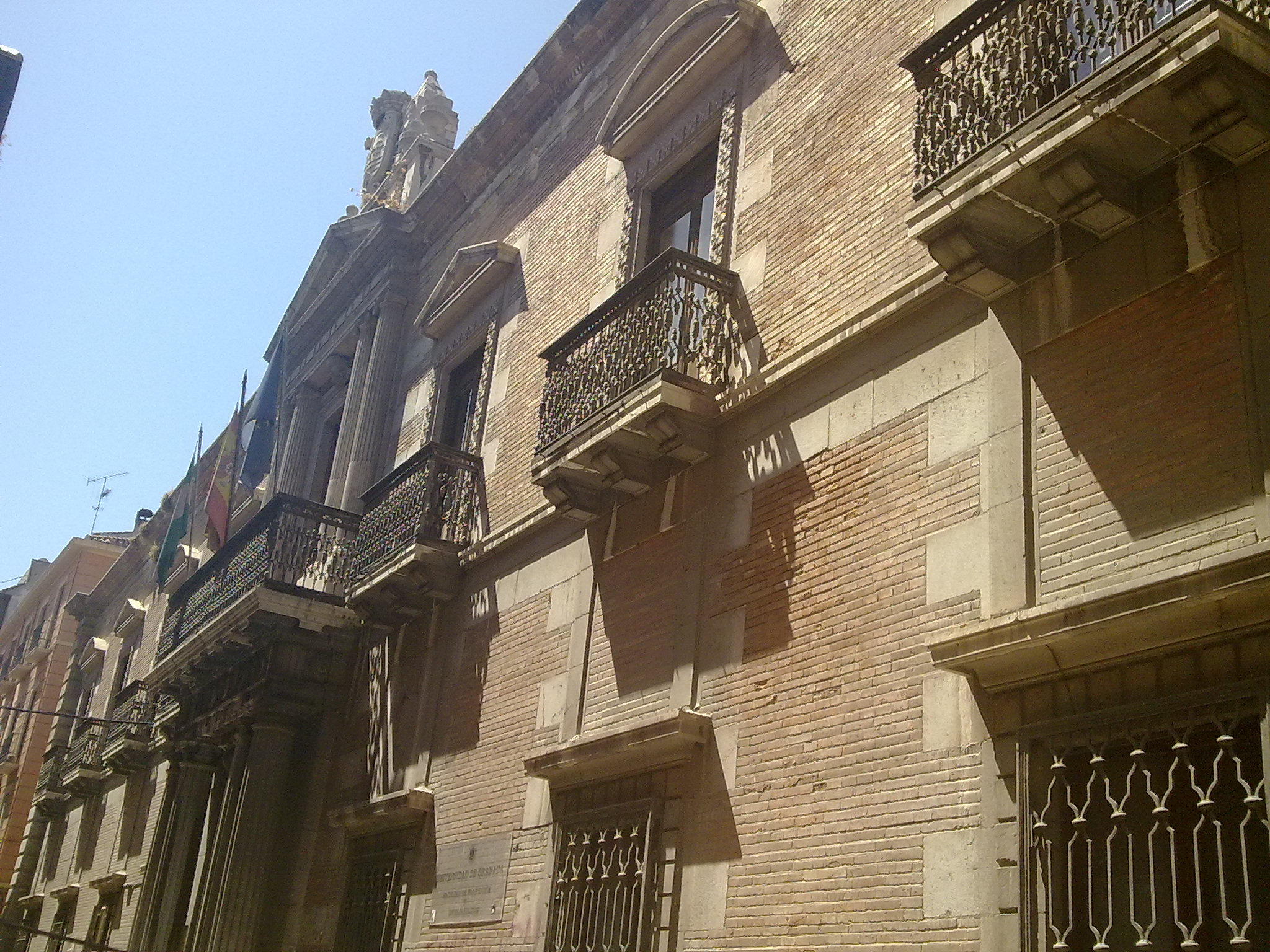
- Motto: "Fidus interpres" (Faithful Interpreter)
- Type: Public
- Established: 1979; 47 years ago
- Students: 1051
- Location: University of Granada, Spain
- Website: http://fti.ugr.es/

The Faculty of Translation and Interpreting of Granada (Spanish: Facultad de Traducción e Interpretación de Granada), also known as FTI UGR, is the translation and interpreting school of the University of Granada, considered the best academic institution for translation and interpreting studies in Spain.

The school is located at the 18th century Palace of the Counts of Luque (Spanish: Palacio de los Condes de Luque), better known as Palace of the Columns, in the heart of the city of Granada. Their motto is Fidus interpres.

Being one of the first Spanish institutions to offer studies in the field of Translation and Interpreting, the school has a large teaching experience in the field and offers the widest language range in the country: four languages B (first foreign language: Arabic, English, French and German), nine languages C (second foreign language: Arabic, Chinese, French, Greek, Italian, Portuguese and Russian), plus other four optional languages (Dutch, Polish, Galician and Czech). It was also the first Spanish academic institution to offer Translation and Interpreting studies with Arabic as first foreign language.

Member of the Conférence Internationale Permanente d'Instituts Universitaires de Traducteurs et d’interprètes (CIUTI), it is a centre of national and international prestige. It hosts several research groups, carries out European R+D projects, elaborates award-winning programmes for fresh approaches to teaching and publishes two magazines (Sendebar and Puentes). FTI also orientates its curriculum to the current demands of the profession, which usually guarantees work opportunities to its graduates.

== Timeline ==
=== From the former Institute of Languages to the EUTI ===
The roots of the current Faculty of Translation and Interpreting of Granada are in the former Institute of Languages of the University of Granada, which dates back to 1929.

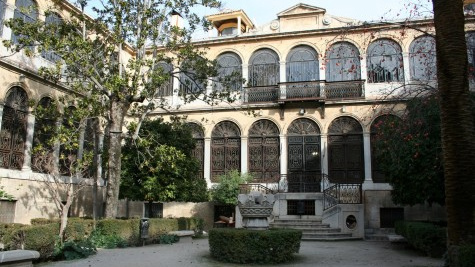

The long tradition of the institute, together with the considerable number of students enrolled in, was reason enough to adapt the former studies to new ones that responded to an increasing demand of professionals within the field of translation and interpreting. Thus, in 1979 the former Institute of Languages of the University of Granada became the School of Translators and Interpreters (Spanish: Escuela Universitaria de Traductores e Intérpretes, EUTI) by decree 2572/1979 of 14 September (BOE 09.11.79). At that time, there was only one centre with similar characteristics: the School of Languages of the Autonomous University of Barcelona (BOE September 22, 1972), which already offered courses on Translation and Interpreting since 1972, although it was not officially recognised as EUTI until 1984.

The first programme of the EUTI of Granada was of three years' duration, having two separate specialties (Translation and Interpreting), three first foreign languages (German, French and English) and eight-second foreign languages (Arabic, Chinese, French, Italian, Portuguese, Russian).

The EUTI of Granada was established as the Spanish public college training the largest number of translators and interpreters with Spanish as native language (or Language A). The origin of its students was 50% from Andalusia and 50% from the rest of Spain and from 23 foreign countries. That is how the EUTI of Granada began to gain international prestige. Similarly, it is important to highlight the great range of courses and seminars offered by the EUTI from its beginnings, with the collaboration of professionals on the field from all around the world. Granada thus gained a reputation as academic space in the field of Translation and Interpreting.

The EUTI of Granada also pioneered the introduction of Terminology as an academic discipline, as well as its participation in the programme of Applied European Languages (AEL).

=== From the EUTI to the current Faculty of Translation and Interpreting ===
In 1992, with the adaptation of the old programme to the new degree in Translation and Interpreting (BOE number 149 of July 23, 1994), now of four years’ duration, the EUTI changed its name and established as the new Faculty of Translators and Interpreters. It was in 1994 when the Faculty took its current name, that is, the Faculty of Translation and Interpreting.

The most relevant event of this new era was the establishment in 1993 of the new Department of Translation and Interpreting of the University of Granada, which is now responsible for teaching and research. Two new languages C (second foreign languages) were included (Dutch and Modern Greek) and also a new first foreign language: Arabic. Thus, the Faculty of Translation and Interpreting of Granada became the first Spanish college in granting, through the Ministry of Foreign Affairs, the qualification of sworn translator and interpreter (Spanish: Traductor/Intérprete jurado) with Arabic as first foreign language (language B).

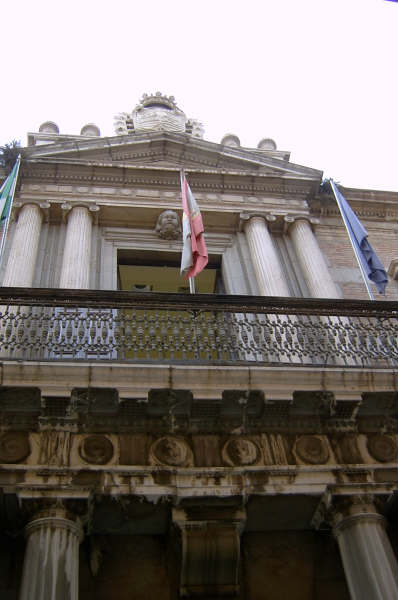
Front facade of the Faculty of Translation and Interpreting of the University of Granada.

In 2003 the MA in Translation and Interpreting (research focus) was opened, which arose from two doctoral programmes of the Department of Translation and Interpreting, quality accredited by the Ministry of Education.

With the adoption of the EHEA, the degrees programmes of the faculty underwent important changes. From 2010 the new undergraduate programme is the BA in Translation and Interpreting, of four years' duration. Moreover, the MA from 2003 has been replaced by two new postgraduate programmes: the MA in Professional Translation and the MA in Conference Interpreting. This reorganisation responses to both an adaptation into a new stage of study (EHEA) and a need to offer a solid specialisation for future graduates.

== Degree programmes ==
=== Undergraduate programmes ===
- Degree in Translation and Interpreting
- Degree in Applied European Languages (in partnership with the Universities of Aix-Marseille, Limerick, Ghent and Fachhochschule.)

=== Postgraduate programmes ===
- Master's Degree in Professional Translation. Specialisations:
1. Legal translation
2. Translation Technologies
3. Audiovisual and Multimedia Translation
4. Arabic-Spanish Translation
- Master's Degree in Conference Interpreting
- Doctorate in Languages, Texts and Contexts (specialisation in Translation and Interpreting research)

== Facilities and services ==
The main building of the school is the Palace of the Counts of Luque, better known as Palace of the Columns, of architect unknown (although some attribute it to Juan de Villanueva). It was restored in 1946 by architects Luis Álvarez de Cienfuegos and Juan de Dios de Wilhelmi so it could host the Faculty of Philosophy and Letters (Facultad de Filosofía y Letras), later the Institute of Languages (Instituto de Idiomas) and, since 1979, the Faculty of Translation and Interpreting.

The name Palacio de las Columnas was probably inspired by the Doric and Ionic columns that decorate its facade. The building, one of the most notable examples of secular Neoclassical architecture in Granada, has a U-shaped plant surrounding an ample garden, with a main body and two wings that rise over the downhill-sloped streets on either side. It contains the library, a multimedia classroom, computer and language labs, and administrative and faculty offices.

These premises are supplemented by another building in calle Buensuceso, holding mostly offices plus the Salón de Grados, Sala de Tutorías, student union, Servicio de Traducción Universitario (STU), a small company created by the students themselves, the offices of the Sendebar magazine, a study room, and a small café in the basement.
