= José Miguel Camacho González =

Spanish ophthalmologist

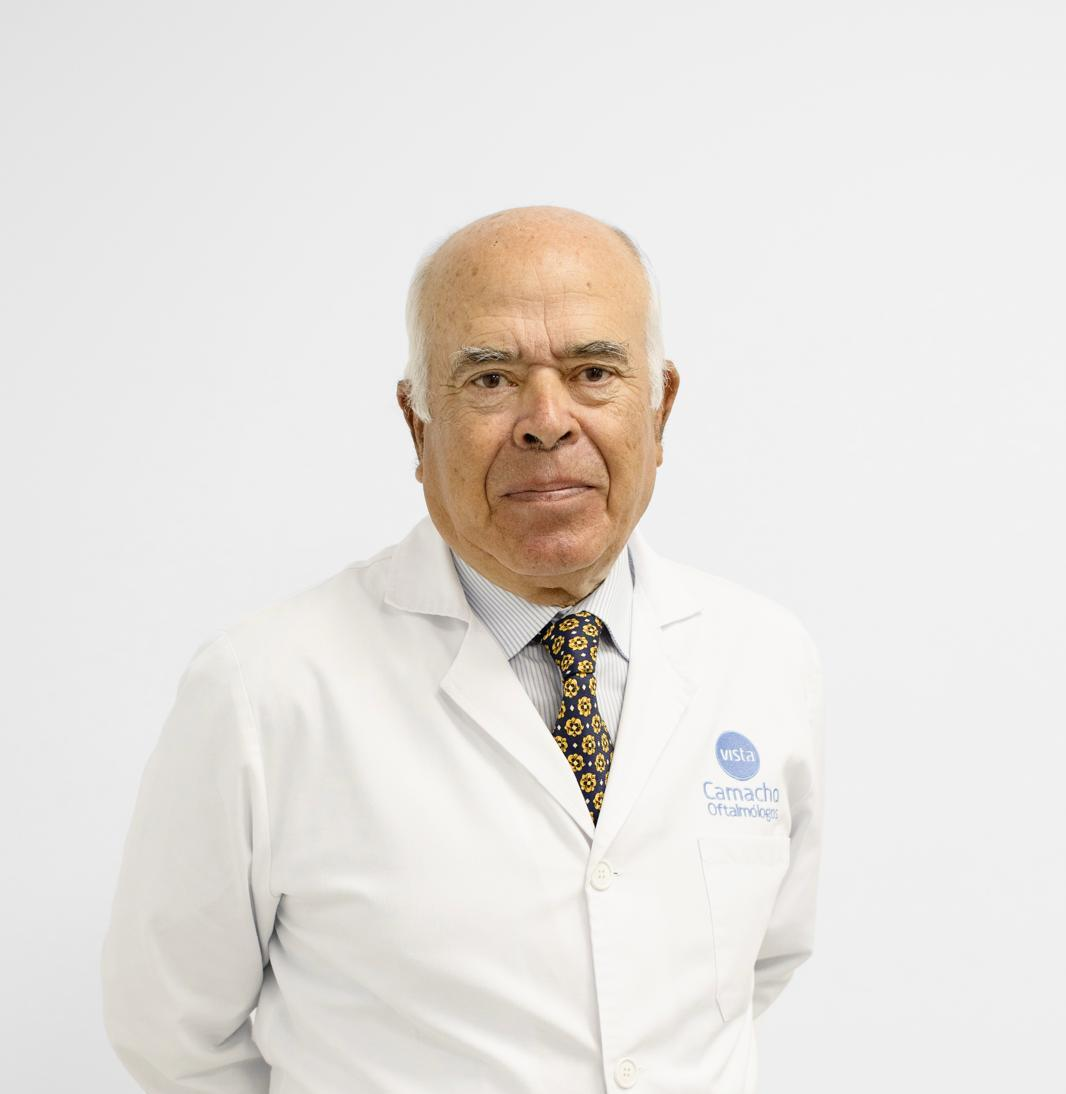
- José Miguel Camacho in 2025
- Born: 17 January 1951 (age 75); Cúllar, Granada
- Education: Instituto Padre Suárez; Universidad de Granada
- Occupation: Ophthalmologist
- Years active: 1989–
- Board member of: Sociedad Española de Oftalmología; Sociedad Española de Cirugía Ocular "Secoir"; LAVINIA
- Father: Manuel Camacho
- Relatives: José Miguel Camacho Sampelayo; Manuel Camacho Sampelayo
- Awards: 3rd Videofestival Secoir Cádiz Award; Colegiado Honorífico

José Miguel Camacho González (born 17 January 1951) is a Spanish ophthalmologist, medical director, and pioneer on intraocular lens.

He was born in Cúllar, Granada. He studied at Universidad de Granada, in 1976 he got a bachelor's degree in Medicine and in 1979 he specialized on Surgery. In 1970s he worked as ophthalmologist at Bola Azul and Hospital Torrecárdenas in Almería, and he cooperated with Instituto de Oftalmología Barraquer.

He opened Vista Camacho, which works with the latest and innovated ophthalmological technologies, including VisX STAR S4 IR CustomVue laser with the Wave Scan aberrometer, and the Spectralis(R) platform, which is a tomograph to make micro-thousandth eye studies.

He is one of the most rated ophthalmologist in the province of Almería by Doctoralia. Manuel Camacho Sampelayo, his son, who followed his steps and also studied at Universidad de Granada and Instituto de Oftalmología Barraquer, holds the eighth place in the ranking, and his brother José Miguel holds the ninth place. In 2010 he got the 3rd Videofestival Secoir Cádiz Award alongside Jaime Campello Lluch and José Miguel Camacho Sampelayo. In March 2022 he provided free services to Ukrainian refugees in Almería due to the Russian invasion of Ukraine, and he was awarded in the same year as "Colegiado Honorífico" by the Colegio de Médicos de Almería.
