= Jan Ivarsson =

Swedish university teacher (1931–2025)

Jan Ivarsson (13 December 1931 – 10 April 2025) was a Swedish translation scholar specialised in the field of audiovisual translation.

== Background ==
Ivarsson studied mathematics, physics, literature, Scandinavian languages and English at Uppsala University. He was very involved in student theatre and later worked at the municipal theatre. From 1960 to 1963 he taught at the Christian-Albrechts-Universität in Kiel and from 1963 to 1970 he taught Swedish language and literature at the Sorbonne in Paris. He later taught from 1965 until 1970 at the École Supérieure d'Interprètes et de Traducteurs in Paris and worked in a number of Paris theatres. From 1970 to 1978 he was General Secretary of the Swedish cultural centre in Paris.

He returned to Sweden in 1978 and worked as a subtitler in Stockholm in film and television, particularly for the Swedish broadcaster Sveriges Television (SVT). He became head of programming with a specialty in drama. He worked with ScanTitling/Cavena on a new computerized time-coded subtitling system at SVT. He retired in 1995 and moved to the coastal town of Simrishamn in southern Sweden where he continued to work as a freelance translator and subtitler.

Ivarsson died on 10 April 2025, at the age of 93.

== Work ==
Ivarsson has translated song lyrics, drama, television programmes and books from French, German and English into Swedish. In 1992 he published Subtitling for the Media – A Handbook of an Art and in 1998 he and Mary Carroll published the influential textbook Subtitling. His 'Short Technical History of Subtitles in Europe' remains one of the few scholarly sources on the history of subtitling and has been widely cited.

From 1992 to 1996 he collaborated with the Language Transfer of the European Institute for the Media working group and in 1995 he was a founding member of the European Association for Studies in Screen Translation (ESIST), of which he was for some years Vice-President.

== Award ==
The Jan Ivarsson Award is conferred by the European Association for Studies in Screen Translation for an outstanding contribution to the field of audiovisual translation. The first award was given to Ivarsson himself in Berlin at the biennial Language and the Media conference in 2010, for his lifetime pioneering contribution in the field of subtitling. Later winners of the Jan Ivarsson Award include the subtitler Mary Carroll (2012) and the audiovisual translation studies scholar Jorge Díaz Cintas (2014).

== Selected publications ==
- Subtitling for the Media. A Handbook of an Art. Stockholm, Transedit, 1992
- Subtitling. Simrishamn, Transedit, 1998
- A short technical history of subtitles in Europe. Online at http://www.transedit.se/history.htm
