= University of Granada =

Spanish university

- Universidad de Granada
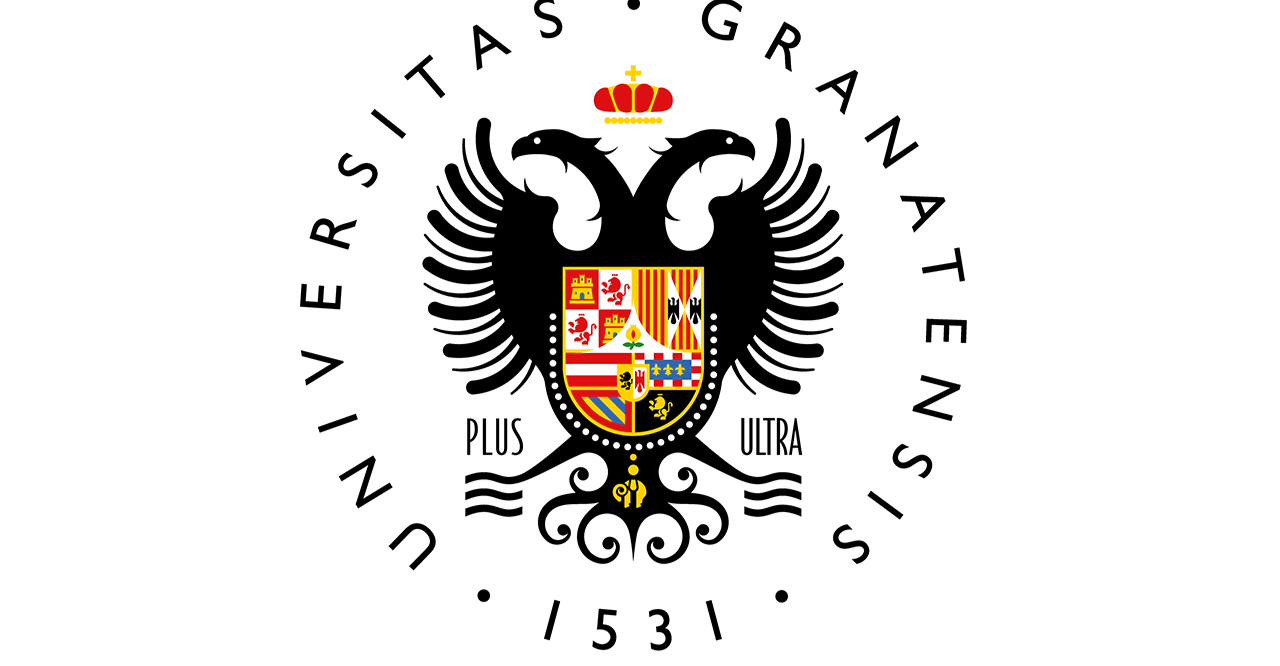
- Motto: Carolus Romanus Imperator Semper Augustus Hispaniae Rex Fundator Universitatis Granatensis, 1531
- Motto in English: Charles I, Roman Emperor always Augustus, King of Spain and founder of the University of Granada, 1531
- Type: Public
- Established: 1531; 495 years ago
- Founder: Emperor Charles V
- Affiliations: Coimbra Group, UNIMED
- Endowment: €395,663,000
- Rector: Pedro Mercado Pacheco
- Administrative staff: 3,400
- Students: 60,000
- Location: Granada, Granada, Spain
- Colours: Red
- Website: www.ugr.es

The University of Granada (Spanish: Universidad de Granada, UGR) is a public university located in the city of Granada, Spain, and founded in 1531 by Emperor Charles V. With more than 60,000 students, it is the fourth largest university in Spain. Apart from the city of Granada, UGR also has campuses in Ceuta and Melilla.

The university's Center for Modern Languages (CLM) receives over 10,000 international students each year. In 2014, UGR was voted the best Spanish university by international students. Outstanding in varied fields from Classics to Modern Languages and Computer Science, it has been recognised as the second best university in Spain and as one of the most important among European ancient universities.

== History ==
In 1526 a college was founded in Granada by Holy Roman Emperor Charles V for the teaching of logic, philosophy, theology and canon law. On 14 July 1531, the establishment of a studium generale with the faculties of theology, arts and canon law was granted by a papal bull by Clement VII, marking the birth hour of the university. This explains its motto "Universitas Granatensis 1531" and his official seal, based in its founder coat of arms with representations of the imperial double-headed eagle and Spanish kingdoms.

The university has moved its location over the years. In the 18th century it moved to the Colegio de San Pablo, which became available after King Charles III suppressed the Jesuits. This building now houses the Law Faculty. Outside is a small botanical garden which was developed by the Pharmacy Faculty in the 19th century and which is open to the public. The rectorate of the university of Granada is now situated in the Royal Hospital of Granada, inaugurated in 1526 during the reign of Holy Roman Emperor Charles V and listed as a BIC in the Spanish heritage classification. The university also has the use of other historic buildings such as the former Madrasa of Granada.

Recent major new facilities include the Granada Health Science Technological Park, housing infrastructures and facilities devoted to its four main uses: teaching (98,000 m^{2}), healthcare (120,000 m^{2}), and research and business development (170,000 m^{2}), with the participation of Spanish CSIC institution.

== Rankings ==
University rankings

Global – Overall
- ARWU World: 201-300 (2023)
- CWTS World: 261 (2023)
- QS World: =401 (2026)
- THE World: 601–800 (2023)
- USNWR Global: 313 (2023)

According to several rankings, the University of Granada ranks among top five best Spanish universities and holds first place in Translation and Interpreting studies. It is also considered the national leader in Computer Science Engineering. UGR also plays a major role in scientific output, placing high in national ranks and being one of the best world universities in computing and mathematics studies.

== Centres and Qualifications ==
UGR is composed of 5 Schools, 22 Faculties and 116 Departments responsible for teaching and researching into specific subject areas. They are spread over five different campuses in the city of Granada (Centro, Cartuja, Fuentenueva, Aynadamar and Ciencias de la Salud), plus two more campuses located in the cities of Ceuta and Melilla, Spanish territories in Northern Africa.

=== Centres located in Granada ===
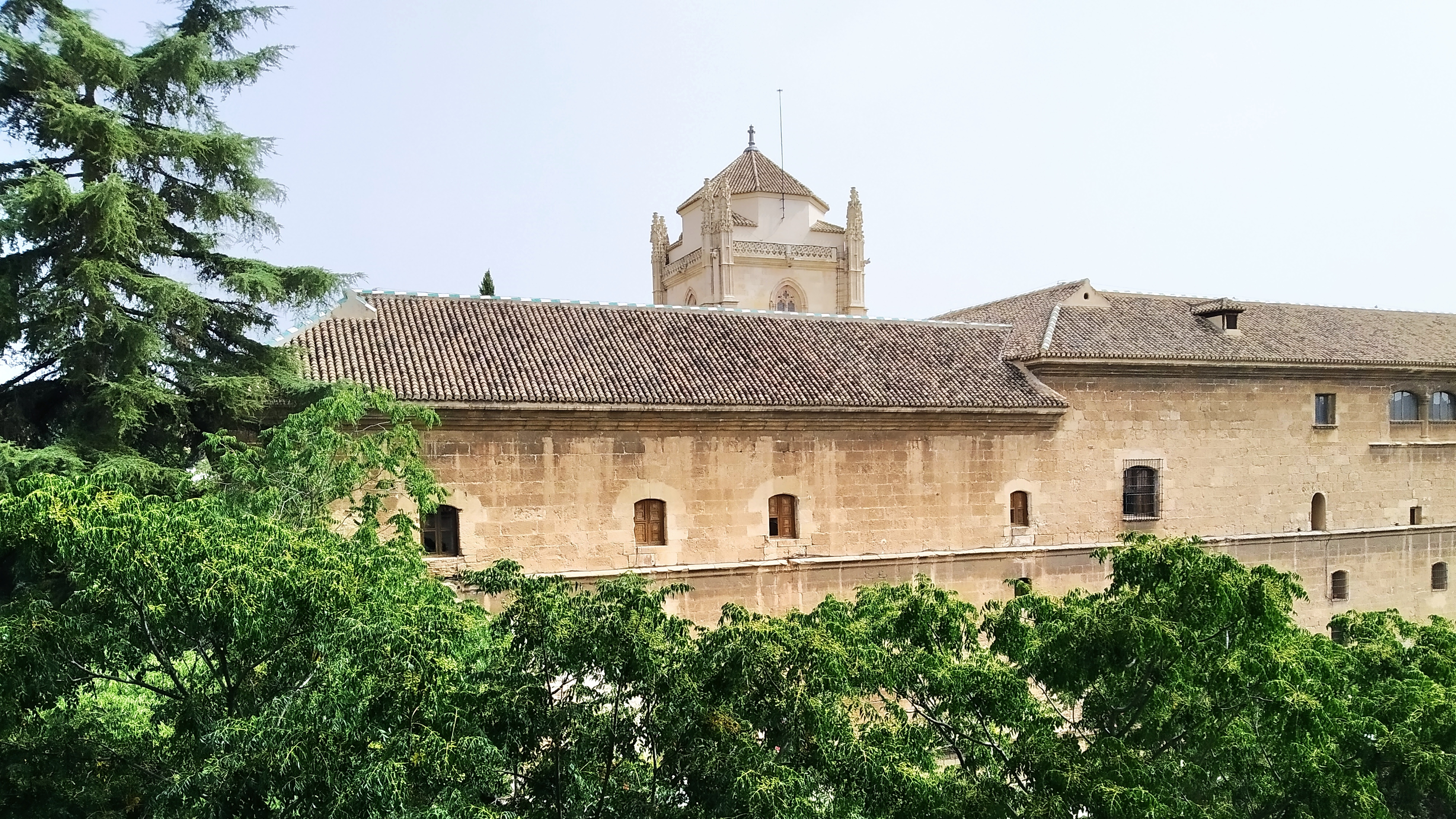
The former Royal Hospital of Granada

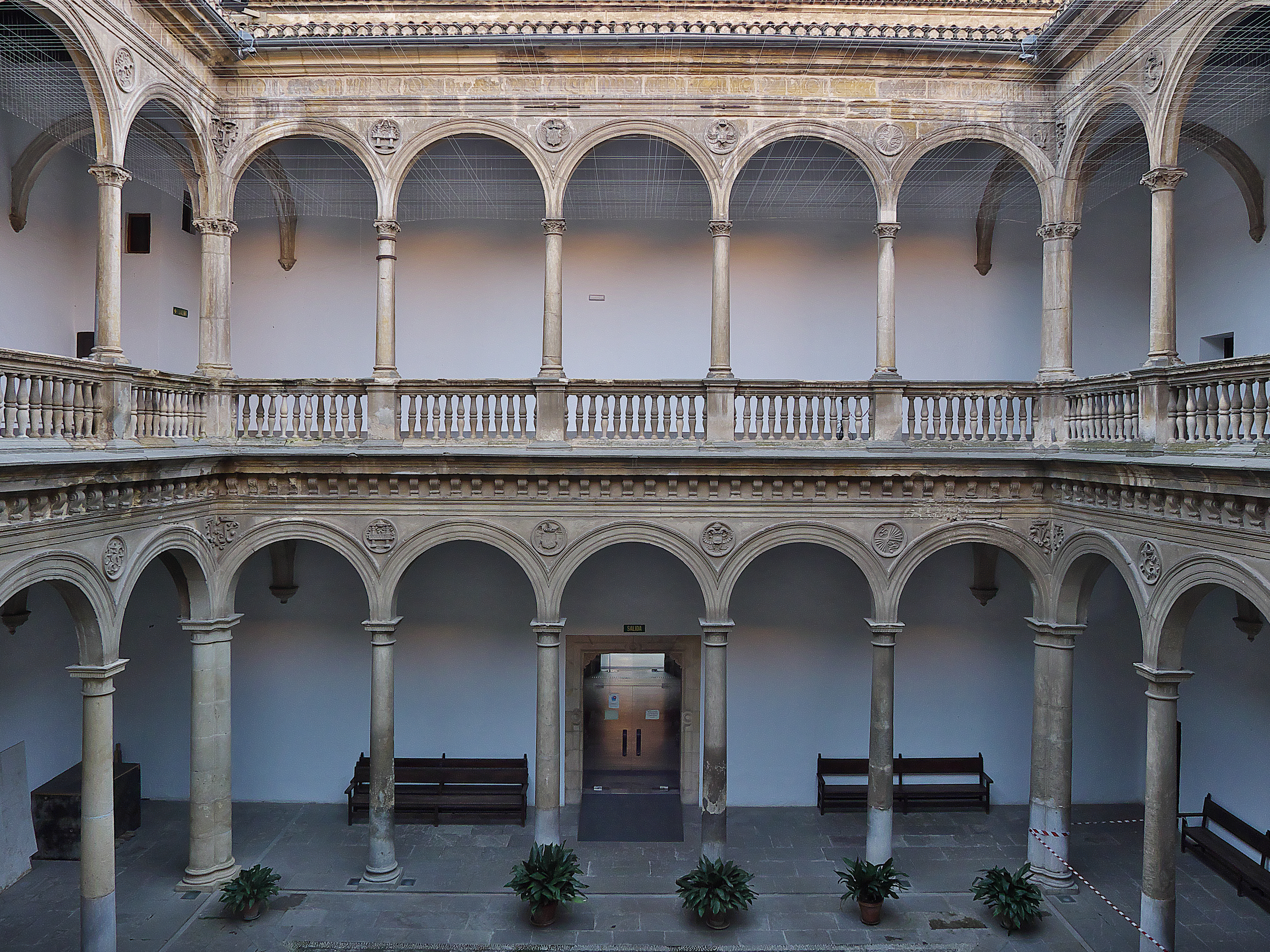
The Renaissance court of the Royal Hospital of Granada (1511–1526)

- School of Building Engineering
- School of Architecture
- School of Civil Engineering
- School of Information Technology and Telecommunications
- Faculty of Fine Arts
- Faculty of Sciences
- Faculty of Sport Sciences
- Faculty of Economics and Business
- Faculty of Education
- Faculty of Political Science and Sociology
- Faculty of Health Sciences
- Faculty of Labour Studies
- Faculty of Communication and Documentation
- Faculty of Law
- Faculty of Pharmacy
- Faculty of Philosophy and Humanities
- Faculty of Medicine
- Faculty of Dentistry
- Faculty of Psychology
- Faculty of Social Work
- Faculty of Translation and Interpreting

=== Campus located in Ceuta ===
- Faculty of Health Sciences
- Faculty of Education and Humanities

=== Campus located in Melilla ===
- Faculty of Social Sciences
- Faculty of Education, Economy and Technology
- Faculty of Nursing

The University of Granada also offers a wide range of postgraduate programmes (Master's Degrees, Doctorate Programmes and UGR's Postgraduate studies), made up of studies adapted to the European model.

== School for Modern Languages ==
The UGR began admitting international students in 1992 with the founding of the School for Languages (Centro de Lenguas Modernas). As of 2009–2010, there were some 5,000 international students, including Erasmus programme exchange students from the European Union. The CLM has agreements with 20 universities and study abroad organizations in the U.S. and in Canada in order to bring North Americans to the UGR, including the American Institute For Foreign Study, Arcadia University, International Studies Abroad and the University of Delaware.

== Notable alumni ==
- Francisco de Paula Martínez de la Rosa, Spanish statesman and dramatist.
- Julián Sanz del Río, philosopher, jurist, and educator. He brought Kraussism to Spain.
- Pedro Antonio de Alarcón y Ariza, novelist, journalist, and politician.
- Nicolás Salmerón y Alonso, President of the First Spanish Republic
- Manuel Gómez-Moreno Martínez, archeologist, and historian.
- Francisco Javier Simonet y Baca, orientalist, Arabist, and historian.
- Federico Olóriz Aguilera, doctor, anthropologist, and criminologist.
- Angel Ganivet, Spanish writer precursor to the Generation of '98 and ambassador in Helsinki.
- Fernando de los Ríos Urruti, prominent politician during Second Spanish Republic
- Niceto Alcalá-Zamora, President of the Second Spanish Republic
- Melchor Almagro San Martín, writer, diplomat, and politician.
- Francisco Villaespesa Martín, modernist poet.
- Alejandro Sawa, bohemian, and writer.
- Melchor Fernández Almagro, literary critic, historian, journalist, and politician.
- Federico García Lorca, man of letters from the Spanish Generation of '27
- José Fernández Montesinos, literary critic, and university professor.
- Américo Castro, cultural and intellectual historian, literary critic, and university professor.
- Frederick Forsyth, British author.
- Juan Francisco Casas, Spanish artist.
- José de Salamanca, Marquis of Salamanca, Spanish businessman and politician.
- Joaquín Sabina, Famous poet, singer and composer
- Juan Carlos Rodríguez Gómez, literary theorist, literary critic, and university professor.
- Antonio Carvajal Milena, poet, and university professor.
- Luis Lloréns Torres, Puerto Rican poet
- Antonio Muñoz Molina, writer and former director of Instituto Cervantes of New York City
- Pablo Heras-Casado, Spanish conductor.
- Andrés Neuman, Spanish-Argentine writer, and journalist.
- Gabriella Morreale de Escobar, chemist and medical researcher.
- Ana M. Sanchez, physicist and microscopy expert.
- Antonio Vidal-Puig, medical doctor and scientist.
- Juan Pizarro Navarrete, physician and politician.
- José Miguel Camacho González, ophthalmologist.
- Ariel Montalbán (born March 1, 1992), is a Spanish illustrator, comic artist, and fanzine author.
- Candela Sierra, filmmaker; comic book writer and artist

== See also ==
- List of early modern universities in Europe
