= European Society for Translation Studies =

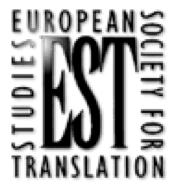
Logo: Jürgen Schopp

The European Society for Translation Studies (EST) is an international non-profit organization that promotes research on translation, interpreting, and localization.

== Name and abbreviation ==
The Society was registered on May 28, 1993 with the Bundespolizeidirektion in Vienna as the "Europäische Gesellschaft für Translationswissenschaft (European Society for Translation Studies - EST)". As an association under Austrian law, its constitution is in German, but the Society's official language is English, so the English name prevails. The abbreviation "EST" should be pronounced as separate letters.

== Aims ==
Its aims as stated in its Constitution are: to foster research in translation and interpreting, to promote further education for teachers of translation and interpreting, and to offer advice on the training of translators and interpreters.

== History ==
On September 12, 1992, the participants at the international conference "Translation Studies - An Interdiscipline" in Vienna agreed to establish the Society, which was officially registered on May 28, 1993.

The Society has held congresses every three years, in Prague (1995), Granada (1998), Copenhagen (2001), Lisbon (2004), Ljubljana (2007), Leuven (2010), Germersheim (2013), Aarhus (2016) and Stellenbosch (2019). The tenth congress was scheduled to take place in Oslo, Norway, in 2022.

== Committees ==
The Society works through a system of boards and committees, each charged with a specific task: the Executive Board, the Advisory Board, the Young Scholar Prize Committee, the Event Grant Committee, the Book Purchase Grant Committee, the Doctoral Studies Committee, the Translation Committee, the Glossary Committee, and the International Doctorate in Translation Studies (ID-TS) Committee.

Presidents:

- Mary Snell-Hornby (1992–1998)
- Yves Gambier (1998–2004)
- Daniel Gile (2004–2010)
- Anthony Pym (2010–2016)
- Arnt Lykke Jakobsen (2016–2019)
- Elisabet Tiselius (2022-2025)

In 2011 the Society also set up the Translation Committee to commission translations of Translation Studies research. The Glossary Committee was established following the Germersheim congress in 2013 in order to produce a glossary of Translation Studies terms and has helped instigate the WikiProject in Translation Studies.

== Awards ==
The Society gives several annual awards: for young scholars to attend summer school in Translation Studies, for academic departments to purchase Translation Studies publications, for the organization of Translation Studies events, and for the translation of research on translation. Every three years it also gives a prize to the best young scholar in Translation Studies.

== Resources for researchers ==
The Society's Resources website includes updated links to lists of conferences, online journals, research groups, translator-training institutions, online bibliographies, and video interviews with translation scholars. The site also has Research issues in Translation Studies, an online collection of tips and guidelines for young researchers.

== Publications ==
The Society has edited books based on the proceedings of its triannual conferences:

- Snell-Hornby, Mary, Franz Pöchhacker and Klaus Kaindl (eds). 1994. Translation Studies. An Interdiscipline. Amsterdam & Philadelphia: John Benjamins.
- Snell-Hornby, Mary, Zuzana Jettmarová and Klaus Kaindl (eds). 1997. Translation as Intercultural Communication. Amsterdam & Philadelphia: John Benjamins.
- Chesterman, Andrew, Natividad Gallardo San Salvador and Yves Gambier (eds). 2000.Translation in context. Amsterdam & Philadelphia: John Benjamins.
- Hansen, Gyde, Kirsten Malmkjær and Daniel Gile (eds). 2004. Claims, Changes and Challenges in Translation Studies. Amsterdam & Philadelphia: John Benjamins.
- Gambier, Yves, Miriam Shlesinger and Radegundis Stolze (eds). 2007: Doubts and Directions in Translation Studies. Amsterdam & Philadelphia: John Benjamins.
- Gile, Daniel, Gyde Hansen & Nike Pokorn (eds). 2010. Why Translation Studies Matters. Amsterdam & Philadelphia: John Benjamins.
- Way, Catherine, Sonia Vandepitte, Reine Meylaerts and Magdalena Bartłomiejczyk (eds). 2013. Tracks and Trecks in Translation Studies. Amsterdam & Philadelphia: John Benjamins.

== See also ==
- Translation studies
- Intercultural communication
- Bilingualism
- Language localisation
