= Mary Snell-Hornby =

British-Austrian translator and scholar (born 1940)

Dr. Mary Snell-Hornby
- Born: April 2, 1940 (age 86); Mirfield, West Yorkshire, England
- Occupations: Translator, translation scholar
- Partner: Anthony Hornby
- Children: Astrid
- Parent(s): Rev. Arthur Snell (d. 1969) and Florence Mary Snell, née Adams (d. 2004)

Academic background
- Education: University of St Andrews, University of Vienna, University of Zurich

Academic work
- Discipline: Translation Studies

Mary Snell-Hornby (born 2 April 1940) is a British-Austrian translator and scholar.

== Career ==
Mary Snell attended Saint Felix School, Southwold, Suffolk, where she attained G.C.E. Advanced and Scholarship Level in English, French and German (with Distinction) in 1958. She was awarded a State Scholarship to study English, French, German, and Moral Philosophy at the University of St Andrews, where she obtained her M.A. with First Class Honours in German Language and Literature in 1962.

The Austrian Ministry of Education granted her a post-graduate research scholarship for research in Austrian drama, which she undertook at the University of Vienna, Austria. In 1966, she received the degree of Bachelor of Philosophy at the University of St Andrews for her thesis The dramatic satire of Karl Kraus and Johann Nestroy. A comparative study.

From 1964 to 1969, she taught in the English Department of the Ludwig-Maximilians-Universität München, and worked as author and editor for the publishers Max Hueber Verlag until 1977, when she moved to Switzerland to lecture in the English Department of the University of Zurich. Here she worked on her habilitation, which she gained in 1981 for her thesis Verb-descriptivity in German and English. A contrastive study in semantic fields. In 1987, the University of Zurich granted her a Ph.D. for her monograph Translation Studies - An Integrated Approach.

In 1989, she was appointed full professor of translation studies at the University of Vienna and was head of the Institute for Translator and Interpreter Training from 1990 to 1994. In 1993, she was a founding member of the European Society for Translation Studies (EST) of which she was president until 1998. From 1996 until 2009, she was an honorary professor at the University of Warwick, UK. In 2010, she was awarded an honorary doctorate of the University of Tampere, Finland. She retired from her position in Vienna in 2008, but has remained active in the field of translation studies as guest lecturer, author and editor.

Since the 1980s, she has had a major influence on the development of translation studies as an independent discipline apart from linguistics and literary studies (see the volume Übersetzungswissenschaft . Eine Neuorientierung, which she edited in 1986, and Pöchhacker et al. 2000).

== Family ==
She is daughter of Rev. Arthur Snell (d. 1969) and Florence Mary Snell, née Adams (d. 2004). She was married 6 April 1973 to Anthony Hornby, lecturer in English at the Language Centre, University of Augsburg, Germany. They have a daughter, Astrid, born 26 March 1976 in Munich. Since 1989, Snell-Hornby has held dual British and Austrian nationality.

== Works ==
- German thought in English idiom: Exercises in translation and style for final year students. Hueber, Munich, 1967
- Vom Lesen zum Interpretieren. Am Beispiel englischer Lyrik. Hueber, München, 1972
- Verb-descriptivity in German and English. A contrastive study in semantic fields. Heidelberg, Winter. 1983, ISBN 3-533-03368-6
- Übersetzungswissenschaft - Eine Neuorientierung. Zur Integrierung von Theorie und Praxis. (ed.) Francke, Tübingen, 1986, ISBN 3-7720-1727-4
- Translation Studies. An Integrated Approach. Benjamins, Amsterdam, 1988, ISBN 978-1-55619-051-3
- Translation Studies. An Interdiscipline. (edited with Franz Pöchhacker and Klaus Kaindl), Benjamins, Amsterdam, 1994, ISBN 90-272-2141-3
- German-English prose translation.Hueber, Ismaning, 1989, ISBN 3-19-002159-7
- Translation as Intercultural Communication. Selected Papers from the EST Congress - Prague 1995. Benjamins, Amsterdam, 1997, ISBN 978-1-55619-702-4
- Handbuch Translation. (edited with Hans G. Hönig, Paul Kußmaul and Peter A. Schmitt) Stauffenburg, Tübingen, 1998/2006, ISBN 3-86057-991-6
- Translation into Non-Mother Tongues In Professional Practice and Training. (edited with Meta Grosman, Mira Kadric and Irena Kovacic) Stauffenburg, Tübingen, 2000, ISBN 978-3-86057-247-4
- The Turns of Translation Studies. New paradigms or shifting viewpoints? Benjamins, Amsterdam, 2006, ISBN 978-90-272-1674-8
- Translationswissenschaft in Wendezeiten. Ausgewählte Beiträge zwischen 1989 und 2007. (edited by Mira Kadric and Jürgen F. Schopp), 2008, Stauffenburg, Tübingen, ISBN 978-3-86057-259-7
- Die Multiminoritätengesellschaft: Beiträge zum Symposium "Sprache, Identität, Translationswissenschaft" 14–15 October 2011 at the Austrian National Library (Oratorium der Österreichischen Nationalbibliothek in Wien). (edited together with Mira Kadrić) Saxa, Berlin, 2012, ISBN 978-3-939060-44-4

== Visiting Professorships (selection) ==
- October 1989: Institute of Translation Studies, University of Tampere, Finland
- October 1991: Institute of Translatology, Charles University, Prague, Czech Republic
- December 1992: Wei Lun Professor, Chinese University of Hong Kong
- August 1994: CERA Professor, Catholic University of Leuven, Belgium
- March 1995: Faculty of Arts, Chulalongkorn University, Bangkok, Thailand
- March 1997: École de Traduction et d'Interpretation, Université de Genève, Switzerland
- June 1998: Depto. de Filología Anglogermánica, Universidad de Oviedo, Spain
- September 2006: Centro de Comunicacao e Expressao, Universidade Federal de Santa Catarina, Brazil
- June 2009: Ionian University of Corfu, Greece
- 2010: Department of Translation Studies, University of Graz, Austria

== Membership of scholarly societies ==
- European Association for Lexicography (EURALEX). Gründungsmitglied 1984–1996. 1986–1992 Vorstandsmitglied
- Wiener Sprachgesellschaft: Mitglied seit 1990. 1992–1997 Vorstandsmitglied. 1992–1994 Präsidentin
- European Society for Translation Studies (EST): Gründungsmitglied. 1992–1998 Vorstandsmitglied und Präsidentin 1992–1998
