= Multimedia translation =

Translation of multimodal and multimedial texts

Multimedia translation, also sometimes referred to as audiovisual translation, is a specialized branch of translation which deals with the transfer of multimodal and multimedial texts into another language and/or culture and which implies the use of a multimedia electronic system in the translation or in the transmission process.

== Application ==
Multimedia translation can be applied to various fields, including cinema, television, theatre, advertisement, audiovisual and mobile device communication.

Audiovisual text can be labeled as multimodal when produced and interpreted by applying a variety of semiotic resources or 'modes'. When various modes, such as language, image, music, colour and perspective are combined in different forms of media, with the major role attributed to the screen, audiovisual text can be described as multimedial.

An example of this, called multimodal transcription, is used in cinema. A film is broken down into frames, shots or phases. Every frame, shot or phase is analyzed, looking for all the semiotic modalities operating within each one.

== Academic study of multimedia translation ==
The translation of multimedia creative works is a subject of academic research, a subtopic of translation studies. This interdisciplinary field draws from a wide range of theories, such as globalisation and post-globalisation theories, reception studies, relevance theory, social science and cultural studies, social psychology and deaf studies.

== Modes of translation ==
This kind of translation is strongly influenced, both in the form and in the substance of its creative process, by the process and type of device employed. Specific limits are imposed by digital graphics, and by timing and mode of use.

=== Dubbing ===
Dubbing, sometimes known as "lip-synchrony", involves both the translation and its synchronisation as well as dubbing the actors' and actresses' performance. Once considered the most comprehensive form of translation, dubbing follows the "timing, phrasing and lip movement of the original dialogue" as closely as possible. Although this mode is usually interlingual, there are some cases of intralingual dubbing, but it is not very common.

=== Visual dubbing ===
Visual dubbing uses machine learning to modify an actor's facial performance—particularly lip and mouth movements—so that on-screen articulation matches the visemes of a dubbed target-language audio track, rather than relying solely on translated audio overlaid on unmodified footage. Early deep learning approaches such as Wav2Lip (2020) demonstrated that a neural network could generate accurate lip synchronisation from arbitrary audio and video inputs, though with limited control over the broader facial performance. Kim et al. (2019) proposed a style-preserving approach using recurrent generative adversarial networks that could modify a target actor's mouth movements while retaining their idiosyncratic facial expressions. In 2025, the Swedish film Watch the Skies became the first theatrically released feature to use AI-driven visual dubbing for its English-language version, with the original cast dubbing their own performances and the technology adjusting lip movements in post-production.

Unlike AI dubbing, which may replace a performer's voice with a synthetic one, visual dubbing modifies only the visual component while retaining human voice actors for the dubbed audio track. The 2023 SAG-AFTRA TV/Theatrical contract explicitly permits adjusting lip and facial movements to match a foreign language as part of standard dubbing practices, without requiring additional performer consent.

=== Subtitling ===
The most extensively studied mode of multimedia translation, subtitling is the linguistic practice showing written text on a screen that conveys "a target language version of the source speech." Consisting of many sub-types, the one most commonly used is interlinguistic subtitling, which is usually displayed in open captions. In places where several languages are spoken, bilingual subtitles are used to show two different language versions of the source text at the same time.

=== Voice over ===
Voice over involves the original soundtrack and the translation being broadcast simultaneously. At the beginning, only the original can be heard, but the volume is lowered while the translated version becomes more noticeable until the end. This mode of multimedia translation gives a realistic effect, so it is usually used in documentaries or interviews. Voice over is considered a "cheap alternative to dubbing" so it is the first choice for translating films in former Communist states and some countries in the Middle East and Asia.

=== Interpreting ===
Interpreting is "the oral translation of an audiovisual product by only one speaker." Interpreting consists of many different types, such as simultaneous, live, consecutive or prerecorded. This mode is usually used in live interviews and news broadcasts.

=== Surtitling ===
Surtitling is similar to subtitling, however it consists of one continuous line displayed with no interruption. Becoming more frequent in theatres and operahouses, the translation is displayed either above the stage or on the backs of seats. Despite being shown in real time, the translations are prepared in advance.

=== Free commentary ===
Free commentary is the variation of an audiovisual source to an entirely new audience and the cultural factors or new goals involved. It is delivered with a spontaneous tone, so the end product is completely different from the original. There is generally no attempt to stay faithful to it, resulting in a translation that usually provides either more details or omissions. This mode of multimedia translation is generally used when literacy is not the main goal, such as in children's television shows, documentaries, humorous videos, film parodies and corporate videos.

=== Partial dubbing ===
Also known as "half-dubbing" or "concise synchronisation", consists of adding a prerecorded spoken text to the original soundtrack. While not being a full translation, it provides the necessary information in the target language.

=== Narration ===
Narration consists of preparing, translating and condensing a text in advance which is then read by dubbing actors and actresses. The goal is to provide a faithful, scripted summary of the original speech. It can be pre-recorded or performed live. The difference between narration and dubbing is that the text is being read, not performed. Narration is also similar to voice over, but is different in that the final product is more condensed and is not always completely faithful to the original's style.

=== Simultaneous translation ===
Also known as "sight translation", simultaneous translation is done on the spot from a prepared script in the target language. It is different from interpretation in that "it takes this second foreign language as a pivot language". It is used when more elaborate methods of audiovisual translation are not an option, due to time or funding constraints. As a result, it is only used in film festivals and film archives.

=== Live subtitling ===
Also known as "real-time subtitling", it differs from regular subtitling in that the subtitles are not prerecorded and are instead inserted on the spot. This mode of multimedia of translation is used for live broadcasts for those who are hard of hearing. A "respeaker" takes the original sound and dialogue of a live program or event and "respeaks" it into a speech recognition software. This new version includes punctuation marks and specific features for this audience, which is then turned into subtitles with as little delay as possible.

=== Subtitling for the deaf and hard of hearing ===
Subtitles for the deaf or hard-of-hearing (SDH) is meant for those who have difficulty hearing the dialogue on a film or television show by helping them to "see" the sound. Although similar to subtitling, SDH adds additional information to complement the verbal dimension. Originally, these subtitles were only available for films and pre-recorded broadcasts. However, the "growing number of legislative and regulatory provisions has set minimum quota requirements" for broadcasters and subtitling companies.

=== Audio description ===
Audio description (AD) is meant for those who are blind, visually-impaired or partially-sighted and assists by providing a narration concerning the visual aspects of a film or television show, for example. The AD track does not interfere with the original dialogue since it is inserted during silent parts. The reader, known as an "audio describer", makes sure to balance what is necessary to the plot while not overwhelming the audience with excessive information. These particular descriptions would be recorded, but they can also be done live (though still prepared in advance), such as in theatres. This mode of multimedia translation has become important in "ensuring the accessibility of audiovisual products to the visually impaired."

=== Animation ===
Animation involves translation as well as script writing. The translator takes silent images, such as cartoons, and creates a script from scratch. Although similar to free commentary, it is different in that there is no previous script written in animation.

=== Double version ===
Double versions are products that involve two or more languages in which each actor and actress plays their role in their own language. The final product is then dubbed and synchronised so that there is only one language.

=== Remake ===
Remakes contextualise a film so that they are in accordance with the target audience and its culture. These translations focus on values and ideology, so the linguistic aspect of the product is less of a priority. This mode of multimedia translation is mostly used for European films remade for American audiences.

== Teaching ==
Since the late 1990s, multimedia translation has found a role in education. B.A and M.A. classes on this subject have been established at several universities across Europe and the United States (Boston, Dallas, Forlì, Genova, Leeds, Londra, Pisa, Pittsburgh, Torino, Udine, Barcelona, Vigo, Winterthur).
