= Odimegwu =

Odimegwu is a surname. Notable people with the surname include:

- Felix Odimegwu
- Ike Odimegwu, Nigerian philosopher
