= Robert M. Murdock =

American art historian

Robert M. Murdock (1941–2009) was an American art historian.

== Biography ==
Born in 1941, Murdock obtained his Bachelor of Arts from Trinity College in Hartford in 1963, followed by a master's in art history from Yale University in 1965. After his graduation, Murdock interned in the Ford Foundation's museum-curatorial-training program at the Walker Art Center.

In 1970, Murdock joined the Albright-Knox Art Gallery in Buffalo as a curator. He subsequently became the first curator of contemporary art at the Dallas Museum of Art, where he organized exhibitions including Richard Tuttle's first solo museum exhibit and thematic shows like "Poets of the City: New York and San Francisco."

From 1978 to 1983, Murdock served as the director of the Grand Rapids Art Museum in Michigan. He returned to the Walker Art Center as chief curator from 1983 to 1985, overseeing various exhibitions, including a retrospective of Jan Dibbets.

In 1985, Murdock became involved with the IBM Gallery of Science and Art in New York, initially as a consultant and later as program director, where he organized exhibitions such as "Theater in Revolution: Russian Avant-Garde Stage Design, 1913–1935" and "Two Lives: Georgia O'Keeffe and Alfred Stieglitz."
