= Mark Sheinkman =

American contemporary artist

- Born: 1963 (age 62–63); New York City, United States
- Education: Princeton University (BA 1985)
- Known for: Painting, Printmaking
- Website: www.marksheinkman.com

Mark Sheinkman (born 1963) is an American contemporary artist. His primary media are oil painting, drawing, and printmaking.

Sheinkman was born in New York City, where he currently lives and works. He received his Bachelor of Arts degree from Princeton University summa cum laude in art history and studio art in 1985.

Sheinkman's artwork has been written about and reproduced in Art in America, Artnews, The New York Times, The New Yorker, TimeOut New York, The Boston Globe, The Los Angeles Times, The Philadelphia Inquirer, El Pais, Il Mattino, Die Welt and many other publications

His artworks are currently handled by Von Lintel Gallery in Los Angeles, Steven Zevitas Gallery in Boston and Pace Prints in New York.

== Art in public collections ==
- Museum of Modern Art, New York City
- Metropolitan Museum of Art, New York City
- Whitney Museum of American Art, New York City
- National Gallery of Art, Washington, D.C.
- The Art Institute of Chicago, Chicago
- Museum of Fine Arts, Houston, Texas
- Cleveland Museum of Art, Cleveland, Ohio
- Fogg Art Museum, Harvard University, Cambridge, Massachusetts
- Yale University Art Gallery, New Haven, Connecticut
- Weatherspoon Art Museum, Greensboro, North Carolina
- Hood Museum of Art, Dartmouth College, Hanover, New Hampshire
- Ackland Art Museum, Chapel Hill, North Carolina
- Grand Rapids Art Museum, Grand Rapids, Michigan
- Davison Art Center, Wesleyan University, Middletown, Connecticut
- Ackland Art Museum, Chapel Hill, North Carolina
- Allen Memorial Art Museum, Oberlin College, Oberlin, Ohio
- Palmer Museum of Art, Pennsylvania State University, University Park, Pennsylvania
- Achenbach Foundation for Graphic Arts, Fine Arts Museums of San Francisco
- Chazen Museum of Art, University of Wisconsin, Madison, Wisconsin.
- Sheldon Memorial Art Gallery, University of Nebraska, Lincoln, Nebraska
- Figge Art Museum, Davenport, Iowa
- St. Louis University Museum of Art, St. Louis, Missouri
- The Texas State Galleries, Texas State University, San Marcos, Texas
- Hite Art Institute, University of Louisville, Louisville, Kentucky
- The Old Jail Art Center, Albany, Texas
- Kupferstichkabinett Berlin, Museum of Prints and Drawings, State Museum of Berlin
- Museum gegenstandsfreier Kunst, Otterndorf, Germany
- Bibliothèque Nationale, Paris, France

== Solo exhibitions ==
- 2022: Von Lintel Gallery, Los Angeles
- 2021: 499 Park Avenue, New York
- 2020: Gallery Joe, Philadelphia
- 2019: Von Lintel Gallery, Los Angeles
- 2019: Lennon Weinberg Gallery, New York. (catalog)
- 2018: Von Lintel Gallery, Los Angeles
- 2018: Steven Zevitas Gallery, Boston
- 2017: Lennon Weinberg Gallery, New York. (catalog)
- 2016: Von Lintel Gallery, Los Angeles
- 2015: Space 2B, Madrid
- 2015: Steven Zevitas Gallery, Boston
- 2014: Von Lintel Gallery, Los Angeles
- 2011: Von Lintel Gallery, New York
- 2010: Steven Zevitas Gallery, Boston
- 2010: Holly Johnson Gallery, Dallas
- 2009: Museum Gegendstandsfreier Kunst, Otterndorf, Germany (catalog)
- 2009: Von Lintel Gallery, New York
- 2008: Grand Rapids Art Museum, Grand Rapids, Michigan
- 2008: Fruehsorge Contemporary Drawings, Berlin
- 2007: Von Lintel Gallery, New York (catalog)
- 2007: Gallery Joe, Philadelphia
- 2006: Von Lintel Gallery, New York
- 2005: Kemper Museum of Contemporary Art, Kansas City, Missouri
- 2005: Fruehsorge Galerie, Berlin
- 2005: Gallery Sora, Naha, Japan
- 2005: osp Gallery, Boston
- 2004: Von Lintel Gallery, New York
- 2003: Gallery Sora, Naha, Japan
- 2002: Von Lintel Gallery, New York
- 2001: Von Lintel & Nusser, New York
- 2000: Lannan Foundation, Santa Fe, New Mexico
- 1999: Galerie von Lintel & Nusser, Munich, Germany
- 1998: Thomas Healy Gallery, New York
- 1998: S65 Gallery, Aalst, Belgium
- 1997: Galerie Thomas von Lintel Munich, Germany
- 1997: Berggruen and Zevi, London
- 1997: Studio Trisorio, Naples
- 1997: Lawing Gallery, Houston
- 1996: Morris-Healy Gallery, New York
- 1995: Gina Fiore Salon, New York
- 1993: Information Gallery, New York
- 1989: Paula Allen Gallery, New York

== Selected group museum exhibitions ==
- 2020–23: Line into Space, Museum of Fine Arts Houston
- 2020: Groß- nicht artig!, Museum gegenstandsfreier Kunst, Otterndorf, Germany
- 2017: Contemporary Masterpieces from Northwest German Public Collections, Kunstmuseum Bremerhaven, Bremerhaven, Germany
- 2016: Dot, Dash, Dissolve: Drawn from the JoAnn Gonzalez Hickey Collection, Pennsylvania Academy of the Fine Arts, Philadelphia
- 2015: Line: Making the Mark, Museum of Fine Arts, Houston
- 2013: Approaching Infinity: The Richard N. Green Collection of Contemporary Abstraction. Crocker Art Museum, Sacramento, California
- 2011: 100 Years/100 Works of Art, Grand Rapids Art Museum, Grand Rapids, Michigan (catalogue)
- 2011: Drawn/Taped/Burned: Abstraction on Paper, Katonah Museum of Art, Katonah, New York
- 2010: The Esprit of Gestures: Hans Hartung, Informel and Its Impact, Kupferstichkabinett Berlin (National Collection of Drawings and Prints), Berlin
- 2009: New York/New Drawings, 1946–2007, Museo de Arte Contemporaneo Esteban Vicente, Segovia, Spain (catalogue)
- 2008: Modern and Contemporary Art from the AMAM Collection, Allen Memorial Art Museum, Oberlin College, Oberlin, Ohio
- 2008: Drawings from the Permanent Collection, Figge Art Museum, Davenport, Iowa
- 2007: Leaded: The Materiality and Metamorphosis of Graphite, University of Richmond Museum, Richmond, Virginia; Traveled to other museums including Palmer Museum of Art, The Pennsylvania State University, University Park, Pennsylvania (catalogue)
- 2006: "On Line", University Art Gallery, Sonoma State University, Rohnert Park, Californiak
- 2004: "Moving Outlines", Contemporary Museum Baltimore, Baltimore, Maryland
- 2003: "Recent Acquisitions: Works on Paper", Metropolitan Museum of Art, New York
- 2002:"Eye in the Sky: Visions of Contemporary Art from the Ackland Collection", Ackland Art Museum, Chapel Hill, North Carolina
- 2000: "A Decade of Collecting: Recent Acquisitions of Prints and Drawings 1990–2000." Fogg Art Museum, Harvard University, Cambridge, Massachusetts
- 2000: "Drawing is Another Kind of Language: Recent American Drawings from a New York Private Collection, Lyman Allyn Art Museum, New London, Connecticut, Mary and Leigh Block Museum of Art, Northwestern University, Evanston, Illinois, Honolulu Museum of Art Spalding House (formerly known as The Contemporary Art Museum, Honolulu), Hawaii
- 1998: "Large-scale Drawings from the Collection of Wynn Kramarsky", Aldrich Contemporary Art Museum, Ridgefield, Connecticut
- 1998: "Art on Paper", Weatherspoon Art Museum, Greensboro, North Carolina
- 1997: A Decade of Collecting: Recent Acquisitions of Prints and Drawings 1990–2000, Fogg Art Museum, Harvard University, Cambridge, Massachusetts
- 1997:Drawing is Another Kind of Language: Recent American Drawings from a New York Private Collection, Arthur M. Sackler Museum, Harvard University, Cambridge, Massachusetts; Traveled to other museums (catalogue)
