= Medieval Rose =

The Medieval Rose Association is a non profit NGO acting in the field of the intangible heritage. Its aim is raising local history, thrills, customs, gastronomy, traditions and myths of the island of Rhodes, through outdoor performing arts and re-enactments. Also, it organizes exhibitions, workshops, seminars and demonstrations regarding old traditional crafts and arts, almost or totally forgotten.

Medieval Rose revives also the medieval life of Rhodes inside the castle walls of the well preserved Medieval Town (protected by UNESCO), through a recreational, educational event – a "Medieval Festival" - under the responsibility of the Hellenic Ministry of Culture (May 2008) and sponsoring support from local community.

Exploiting the fact that the medieval society of Rhodes had been multi-cultural whereas administrated by the Order of the Knights of St. John, the Medieval Rose re-creates a multi-national project with the participation and collaboration of other EU countries, such as Italy, Germany, France and Portugal as well as local people, thus developing intercultural dialogue and cultural exchange.
