= Doug Argue =

American painter

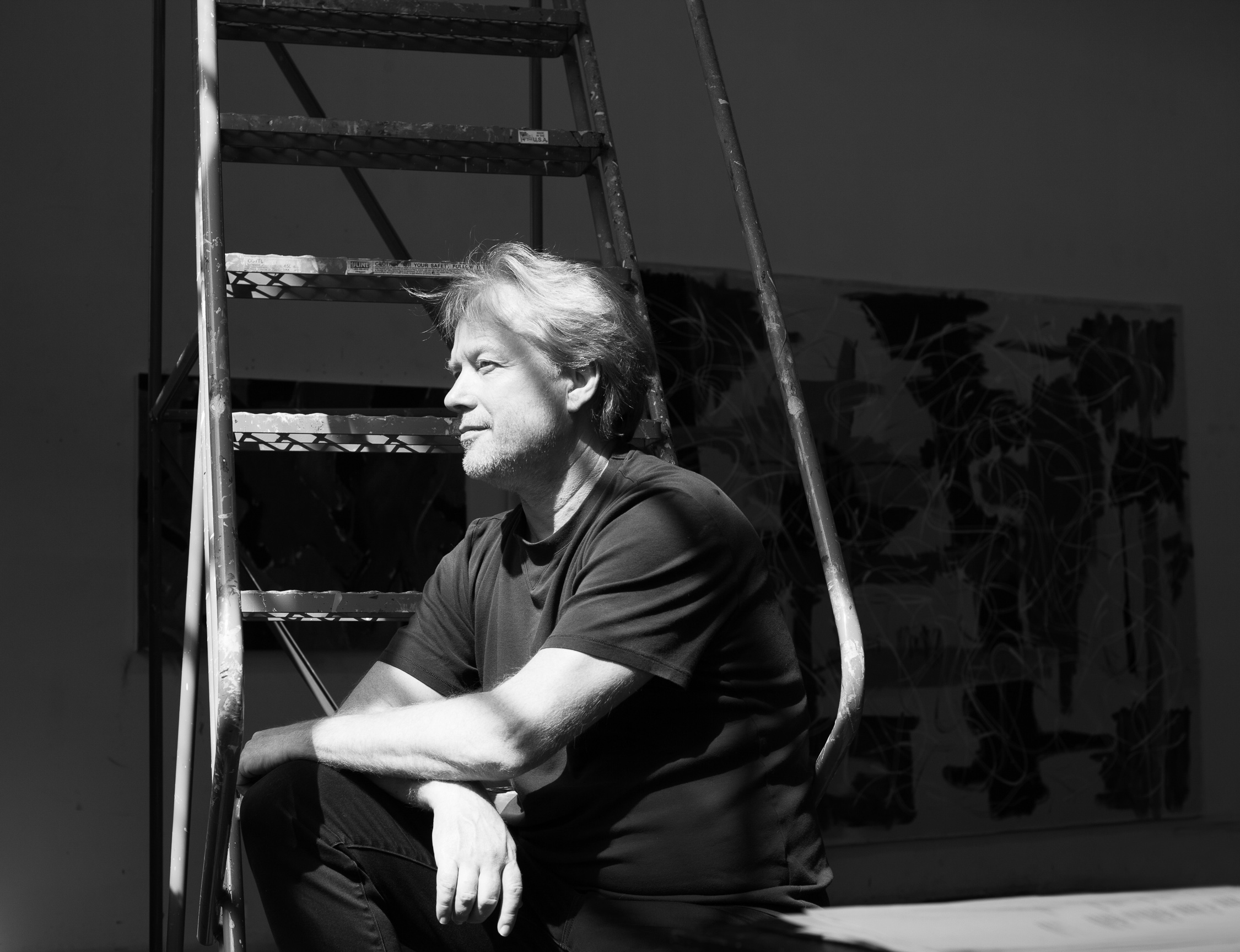
- Born: January 21, 1962 (age 64); Saint Paul, Minnesota
- Education: Bemidji State University; University of Minnesota
- Notable work: Randomly Placed Exact Percentages (2009-2013); Isotropic (2009-2013)
- Website: dougargue.com

Doug Argue (born January 21, 1962, in Saint Paul, Minnesota) is an American painter based in New York City. Over a forty-year career, Argue has developed a well-known and recognizable body of work that ranges from pure abstraction to representation. His work reflects a poetic interest in the relationship between infinity and the individual, forming an expansive vision shaped by his travels, readings, and connections with creatives worldwide. Argue’s paintings capture the constant flux and shifting nature of life. His oeuvre includes larger-than-life, expressionist works that explore themes of time, space, the environment, and the nature of perception, distinguishing his practice from the abstract or conceptual art of many of his contemporaries.

== Early life and education ==
Argue was born and raised in Saint Paul Minnesota. He attended Bemidji State University and later studied at the University of Minnesota between 1980 and 1983.

During this period, he developed an interest in the physical and material properties of painting, influenced in part by his athletic background.

As a young artist, Argue traveled in Europe, where he encountered German Expressionism and Renaissance painting firsthand. He has cited artists such as Edvard Munch, as well as 16th-century Italian painters including Titian and Tintoretto, as formative influences, particularly for their scale, emotional intensity, and treatment of the human figure.

== Career ==
=== Early figurative work (1980s) ===
Argue gained early recognition in the early 1980s for large-scale figurative paintings characterized by gestural brushwork, psychological intensity, and expressive distortion. In 1985, while in his early twenties, he was given a museum exhibition at the Walker Art Center in Minneapolis.

Critic Donald Kuspit described this period of Argue’s work as figurative expressionism marked by emotional extremity and confrontational imagery, situating it within a broader resurgence of expressive painting in the late 20th century. During this time, Argue often depicted interiors, bars, and isolated figures, with works such as Untitled (1983), Angry Young Man (1984), and Morgue (1985) entering museum collections.

=== Expansion of scale and structure (late 1980s–1990s) ===
Following the late 1980s, Argue’s work began to emphasize compositional structure and the use of repeated elements to suggest larger systems. While retaining painterly intensity and scale, his paintings increasingly addressed themes of collectivity, perception, and social organization.

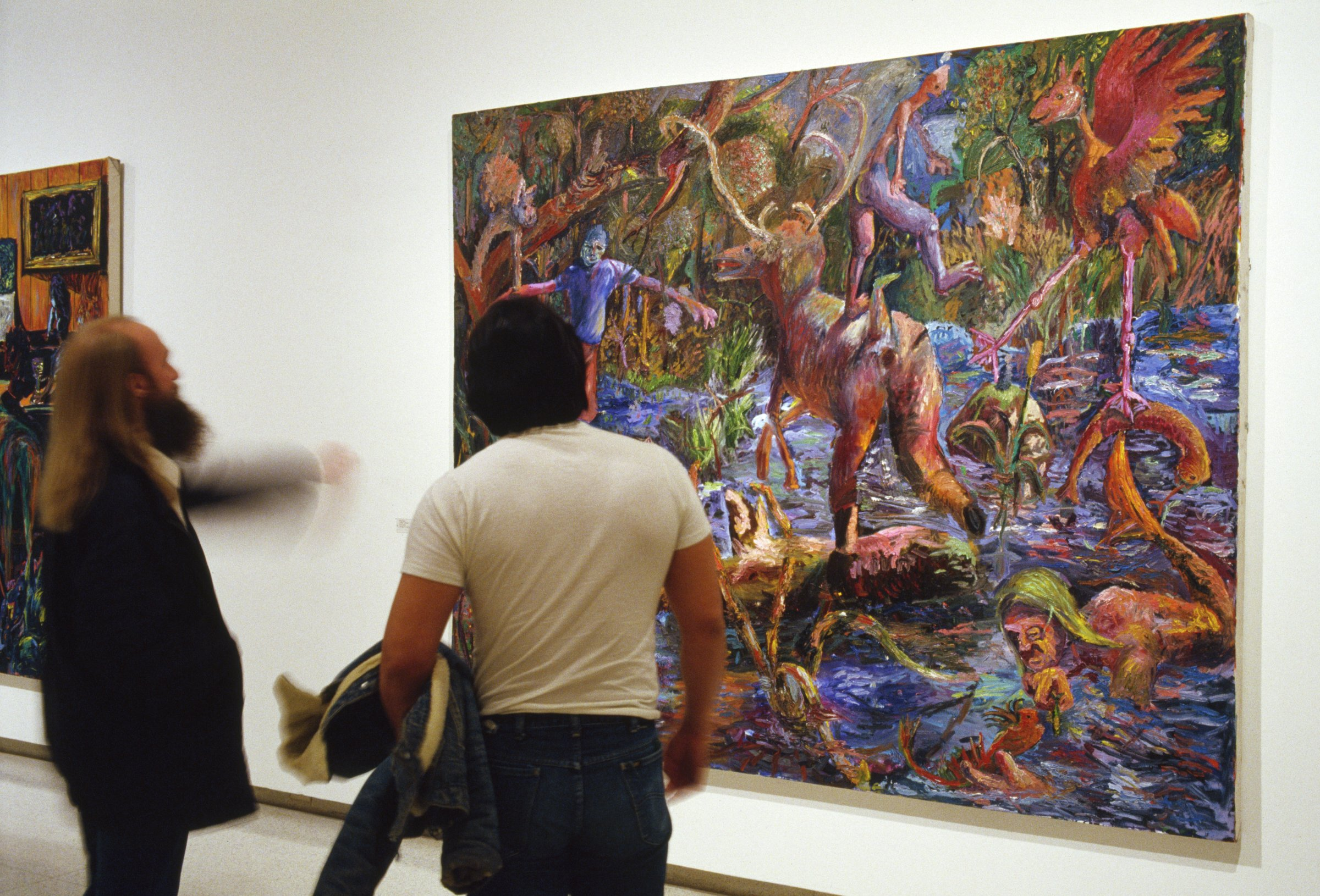
Doug Argue's exhibition at the Walker Art Center Vernissage in December 1985.

After the Birth of his son Argue worked on an intimate series of father and son paintings from 1991 to 1994 which culminated in a museum exhibition at the Minneapolis Institute of Arts.

Since 1983, Argue’s work has been exhibited widely in solo and group exhibitions across the United States, Europe, and Australia.

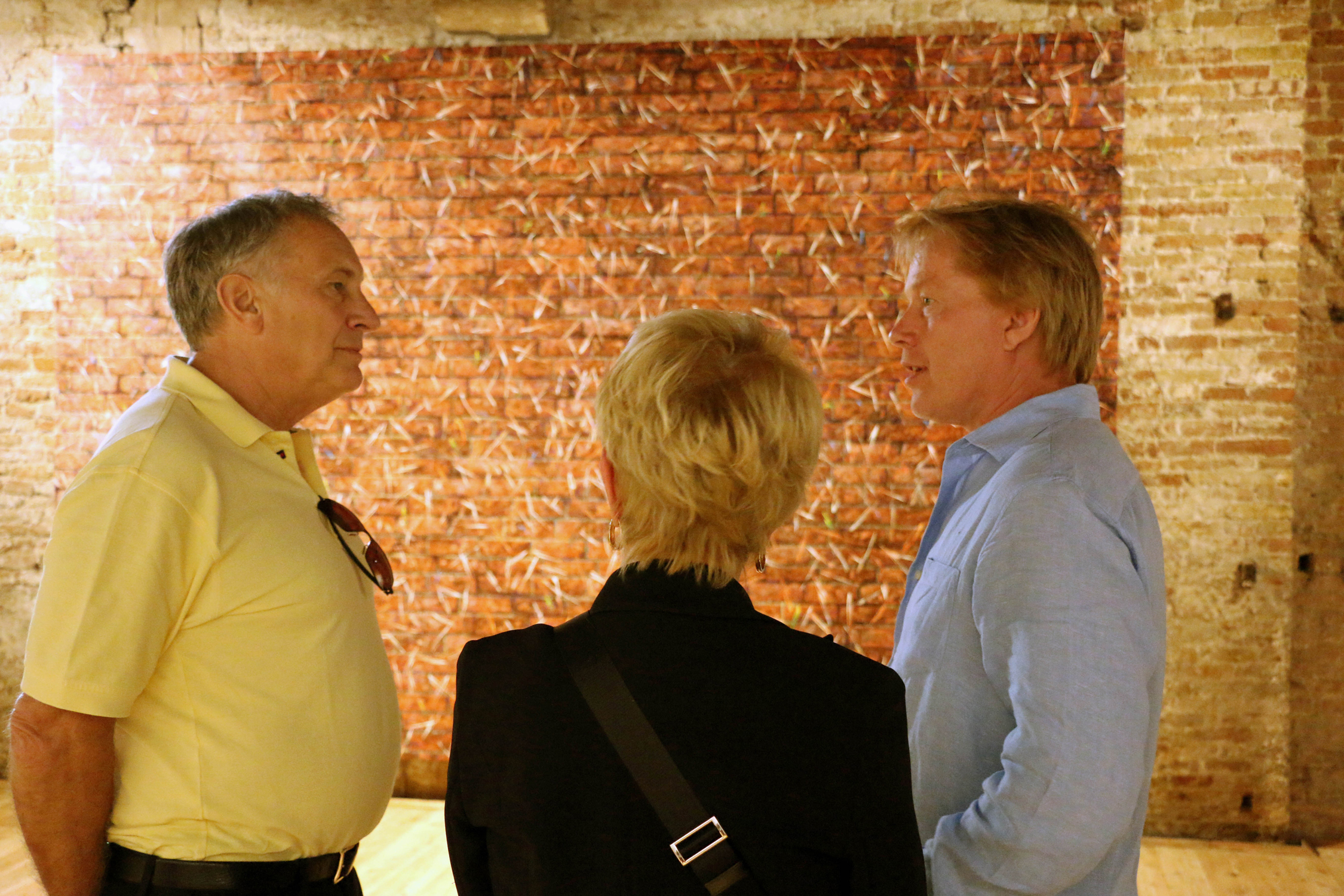
Doug_Argue in conversation with US Ambassador to Italy John R. Phillips In_2015, during the Venice Biennale at Doug's exhibit, Scattered Rhymes, in the Palazzo Contarini Dal Zaffo on the Grand Canal

=== Use of language and letters (2008–present) ===
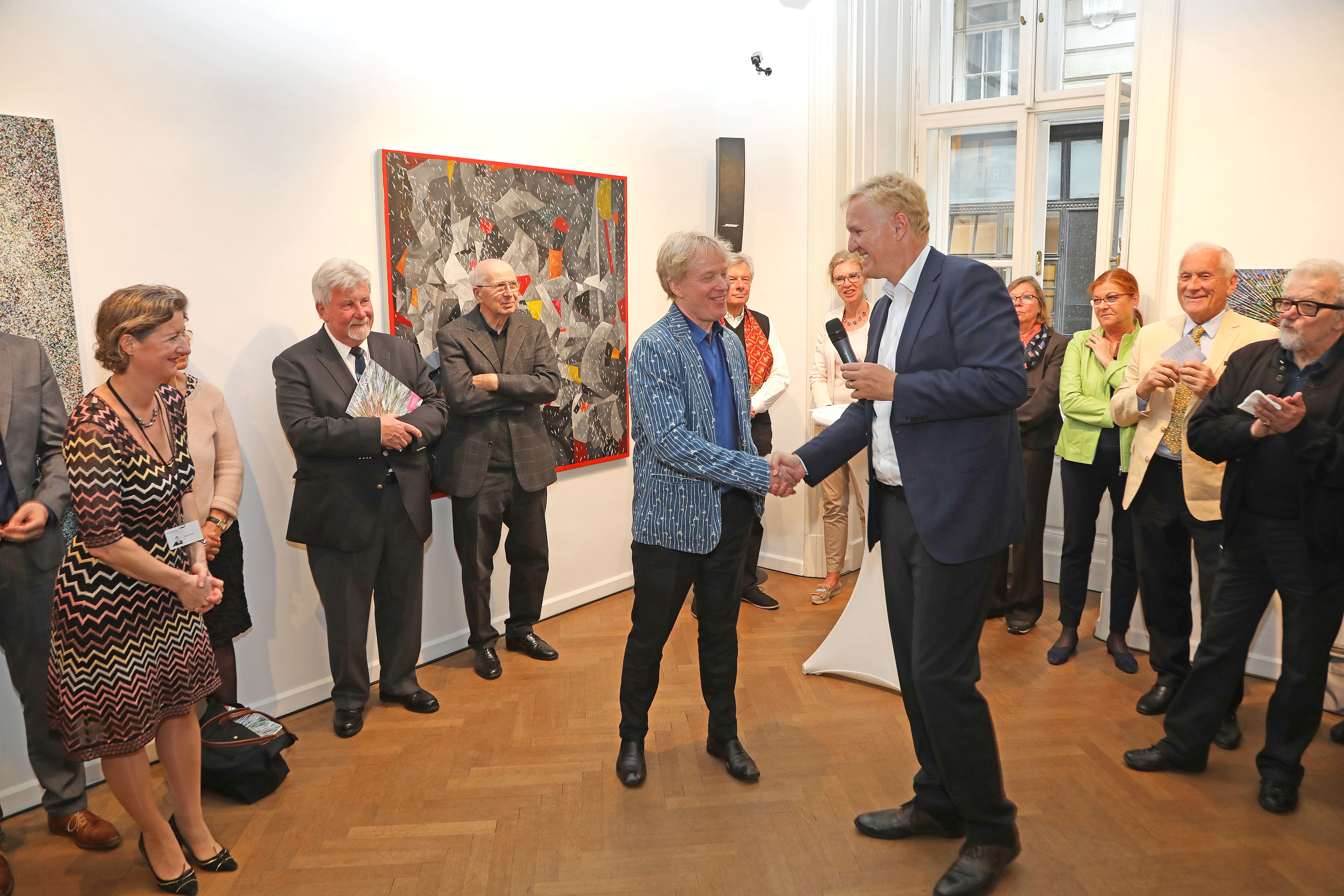
Doug Argue opening at Kovacek gallery in Vienna with introduction by Prof Dr._Klaus Albrecht Schröder the director of the Albertina Museum in Vienna

Beginning around 2008, letters became a central and enduring element of Argue’s work. Rather than functioning as readable text, letters are treated as visual units applied like brushstrokes that accumulate, fragment, and obscure meaning. Argue has described letters as fundamental particles that combine and recombine, analogous to atoms or chromosomes, reflecting cultural flux and the continual re-formation of history.

These language-based paintings are not strictly abstract, as letters remain recognizable even when legibility dissolves. In works such as Genesis (2007–2009), the surface is constructed entirely from letters drawn from the Book of Genesis, rendered unreadable through scale and density.

Between 2017 and 2022, Argue produced a series of paintings in which historical images were overlaid with dense fields of letters, suggesting revision, instability, and reinterpretation rather than quotation or homage.

Career Retrospective

In 2023 Argue was given the rare honor of a career retrospective. It was held at the Weisman Art Museum and titled Letters to the Future. This exhibition was curated by the well-known museum director and curator Elizabeth Armstrong, and it brought together works from all periods of his career from 1980 to 2023. It was accompanied by a survey book of the same title published by Skira in Milan, Italy.

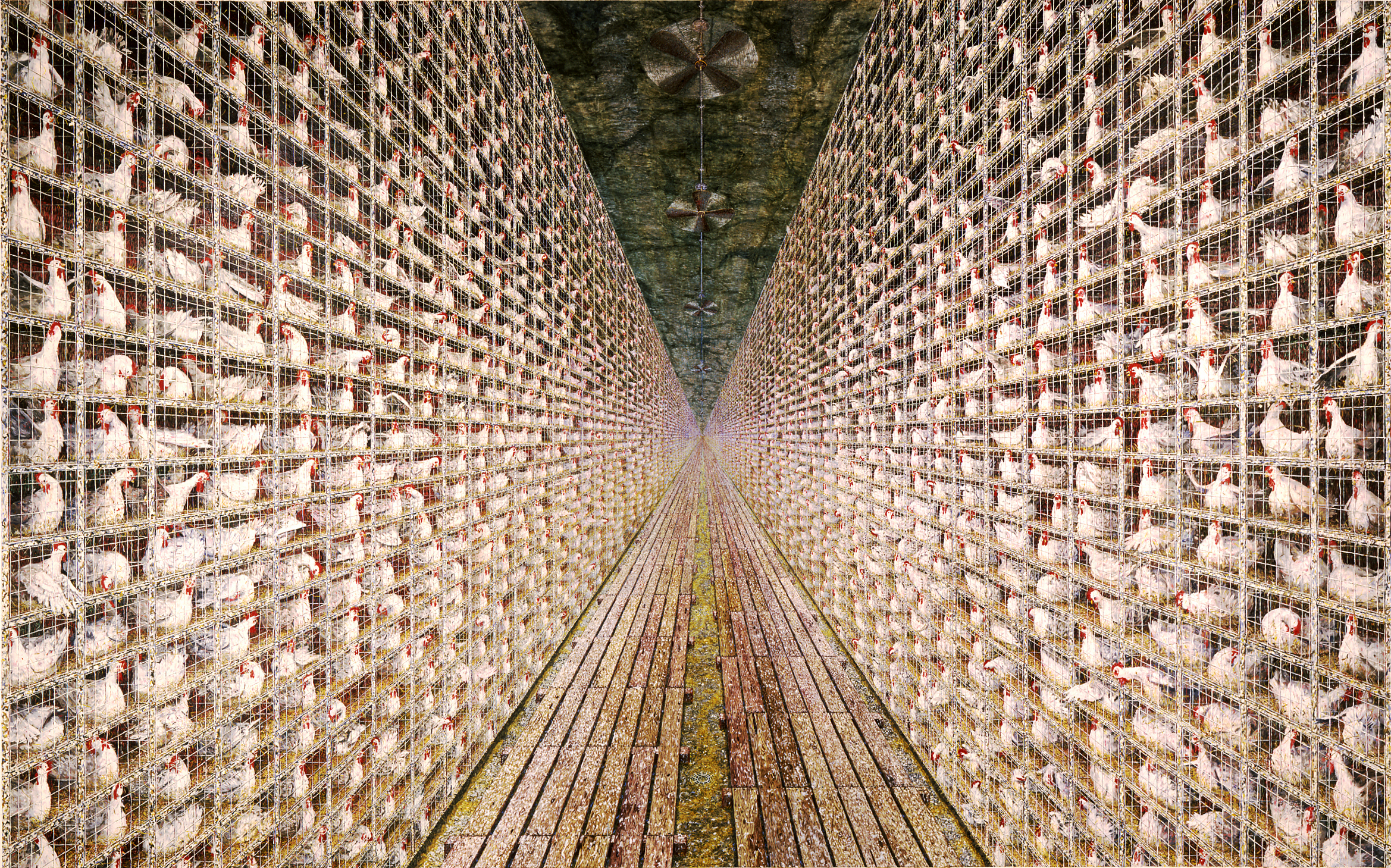
Doug Argue's 1994 Untitled, an oil painting on canvas (144 in. x 216 in.), is on long-term loan to the Weisman Art Museum at the University of Minnesota in Minneapolis.

=== Artwork in the World Trade Center ===
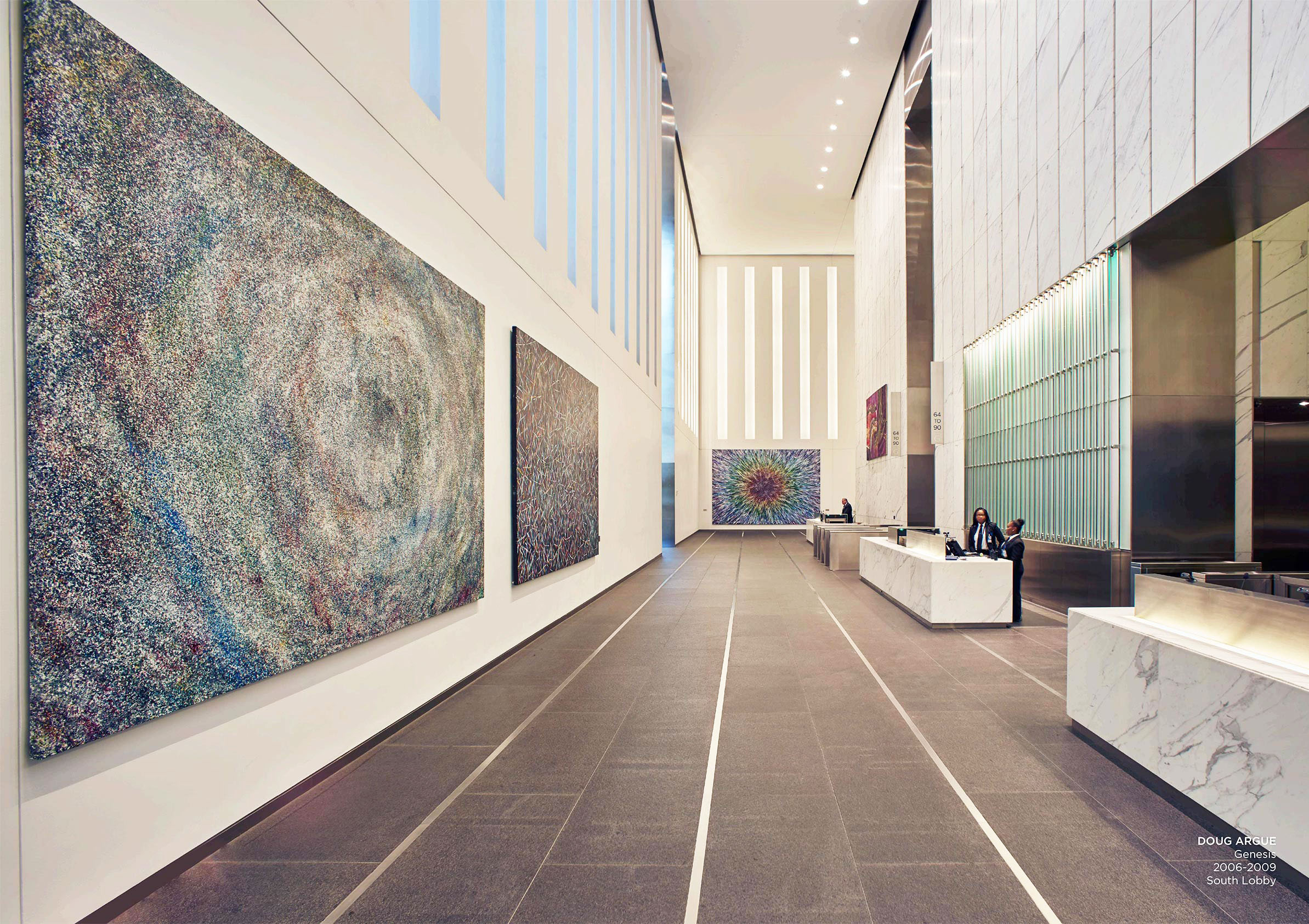
Doug Argue paintings in the north lobby of One World Trade Center, New York City. From left: Randomly Placed Exact Percentages (112 in. x 162 in.) and Isotropic (112 in. x 160 in.). Both are oil on canvas. Genesis (160 in. x 230 in.), oil on linen.

In November 2014, three large oil paintings by Argue (Randomly Placed Exact Percentages (2009-2013), Genesis (2007-09) and Isotropic (2009-2013)) were installed in the lobby of One World Trade Center as part of the art collection of the Port Authority of New York and New Jersey, which owns the building.

=== 56th Venice Biennale ===
In 2015, during the Venice Biennale he exhibited Scattered Rhymes in the Palazzo Contarini Dal Zaffo on the Grand Canal.

=== Special project (2018) ===
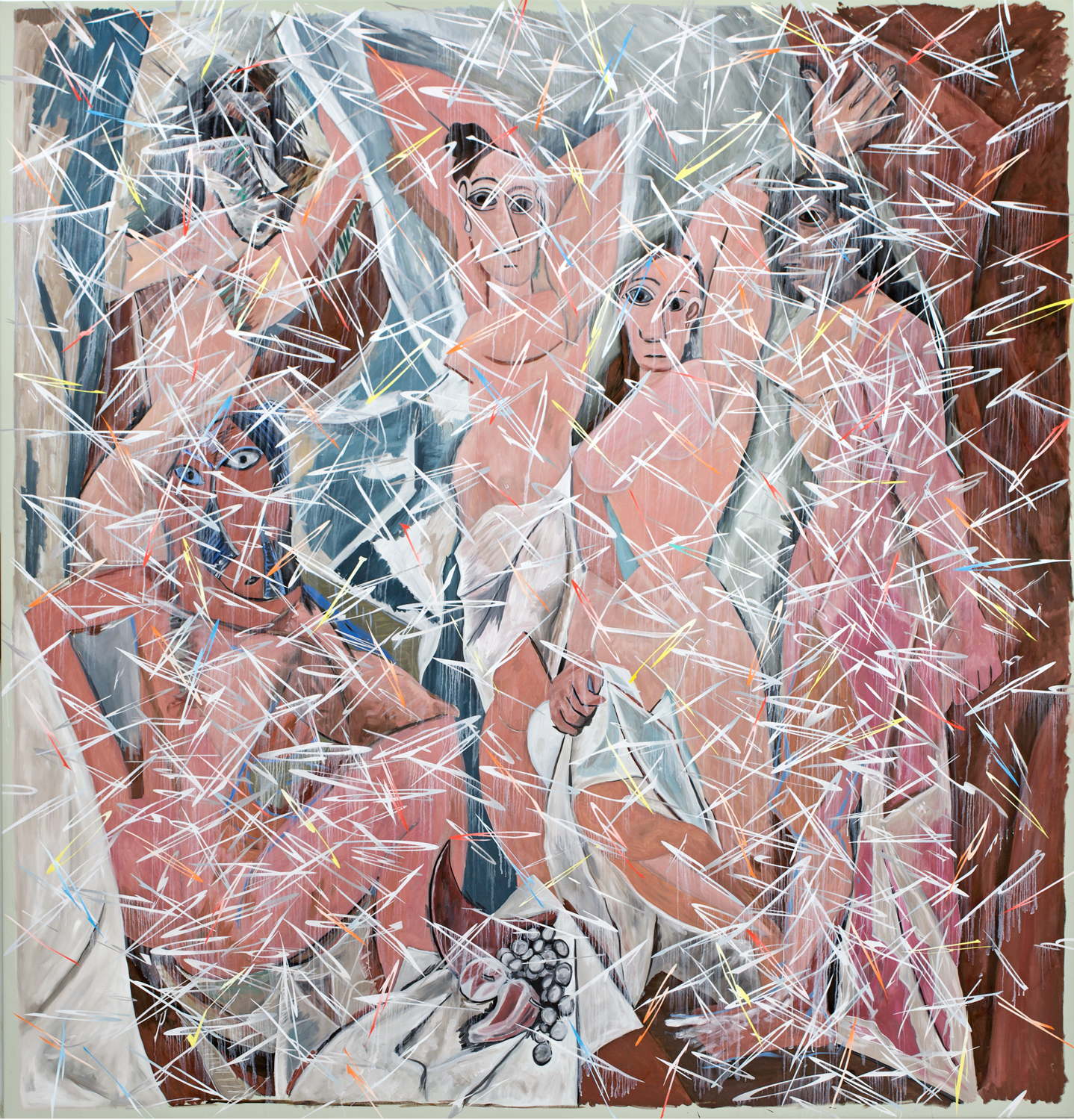
Footfalls Echo in the Memory, an oil painting by Doug Argue completed in 2018, began with his reversed copy of Picasso's 1907 Les Demoiselles d'Avignon. He then layered the modern masterwork with a blizzard of torqued and twisted letters. The painting (99 in. x 95 in.) was first shown at Marc Straus Gallery in New York City in 2018.

In 2018, his work Footfalls Echo in Memory (2017), a re-visitation of Picasso's Les Demoiselles d'Avignon, was both the source for choreography and part of the scenography for News of the World, a dance show performed by ODC/Dance.

== Publications and critical reception ==
In 2020, Argue’s survey monograph Doug Argue: Letters to the Future was published by Skira (Milan). The book includes essays and interviews by critics and curators, including Elizabeth Armstrong and Claude Peck, and documents several decades of the artist’s work.

Armstrong, writing for Argue’s museum survey, emphasized the continuity between his early expressionist paintings and later modernist works, describing a persistent engagement with scale, physicality, and historical reference.

Argue has also been the subject of critical essays by Donald Kuspit, as well as coverage in international art publications, including The Art Newspaper.

== Personal life ==
Argue lives and works in New York City. He has one son, Mattison LeMieux from a previous relationship. He was formerly married to landscape architect Mary Margaret Jones; the couple divorced in 2020.

== Selected bibliography ==
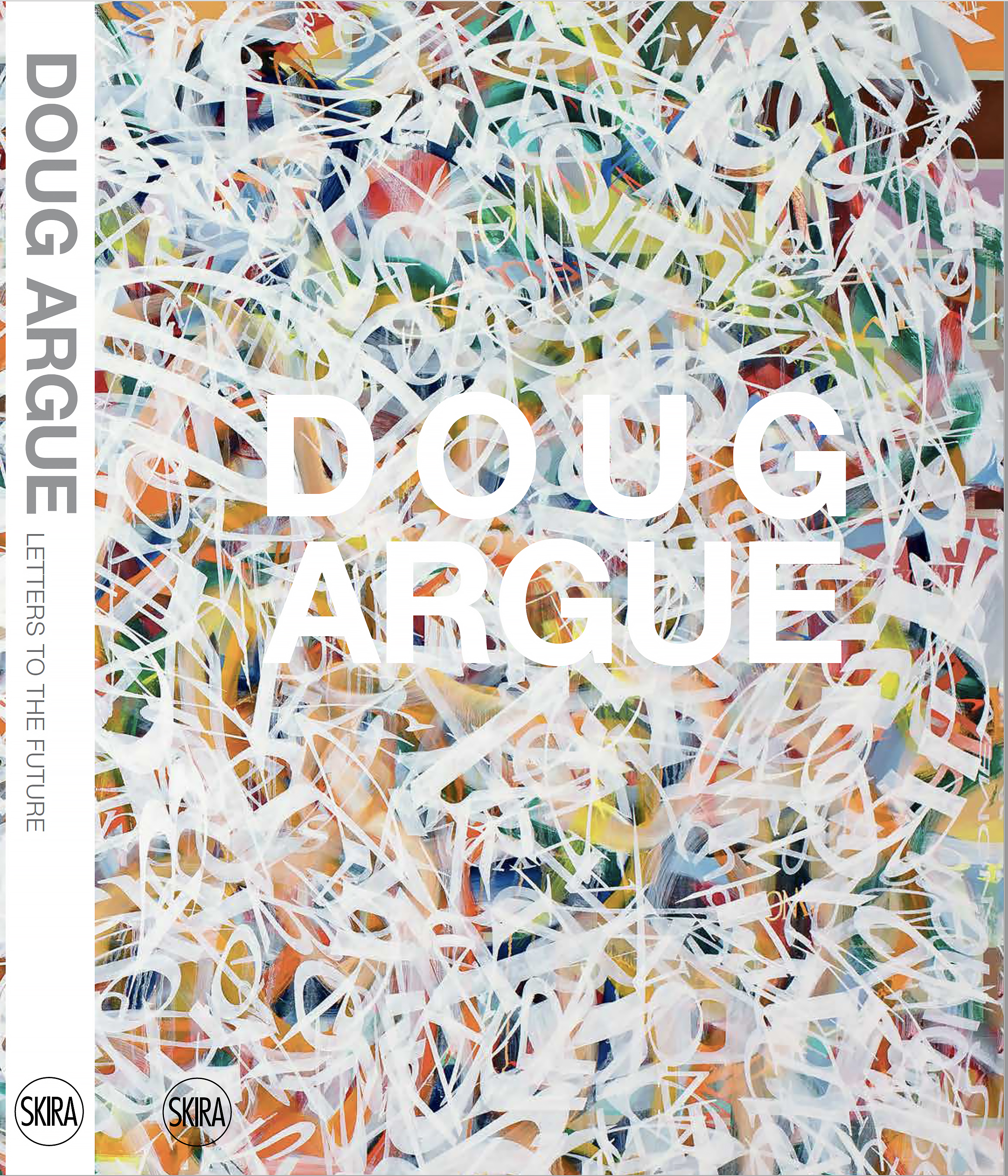
Doug Argue: Letters to the Future, published by Skira in 2020, contains essays, a poem by Ocean Vuong, an interview with the artist and 175 color plates of Argue's work from the 1980s to 2019.

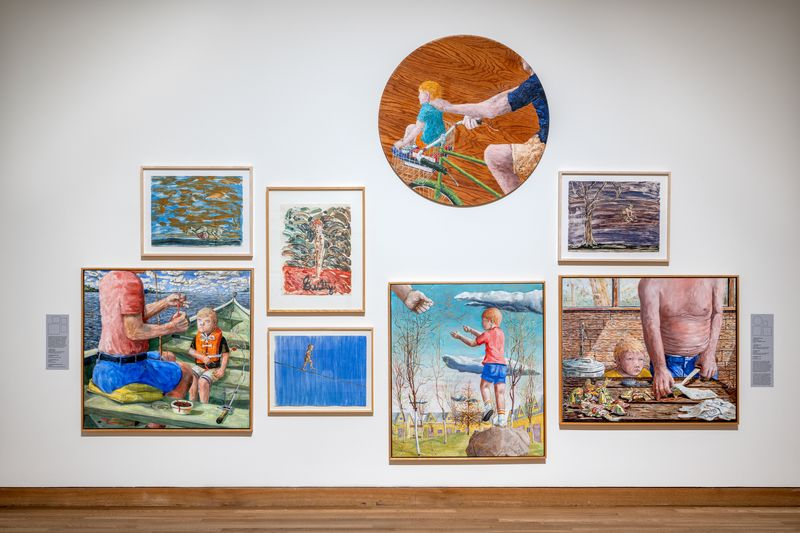
Father and son exhibition Letters to the Future Weisman Art Museum, Minneapolis, MN

- Doug Argue: Letters to the Future (Skira, 2020)

== Selected exhibitions ==
- Minneapolis Institute of Art
- Walker Art Center
- Minnesota Museum of American Art
- Weisman Art Museum
- Grand Rapids Art Museum
- Cafesjian Museum of Art, Yerevan, Armenia
- Port Authority, World Trade Center, NY
- Target Corporation, Minneapolis, MN
- Minneapolis Public Library, Minneapolis, MN

== Awards and recognition ==
- National Endowment for the Arts Fellowship (1987)
- Rome Prize (1997)
- Pollock-Krasner Foundation Grant (1995)
- Bush Foundation Fellowship (1988)
- London International Creative Competition First Prize (2009)
