= Cultural fusion theory =

Cultural fusion theory (CFT) describes the process that people, typically immigrants, undergo when they come in contact with a new environment and culture. CFT provides an account that differs from more prominent theories of cultural adaptation, which propose models in which immigrants gradually adapt to a new culture while leaving their old culture behind. In contrast, CFT maintains that cultural adaptation is an ongoing process that involves constant interaction between a newcomer and a "host" culture. The newcomer continuously learns and integrates new cultural knowledge into their pre-existing culture, thus adapting to a new culture but not abandoning their previous culture. In addition, newcomers' interactions with the host culture change the host culture as well so that the process is dynamic; change goes both ways. Though often described in terms of a newcomer and host culture, which suggests two "participants" in the cultural exchange, interactions between a newcomer and a host culture occur in and through a variety of channels. In other words, this is a dynamic, interactive process affecting both the newcomer and the host culture, and it takes place simultaneously in multiple domains.

== Background ==
CFT is part of the field of intercultural communication, an area of communication studies that focuses on how people communicate across cultures whether in an international context (i.e., cultures existing in different parts of the world usually in different countries) or a domestic context (i.e., cultures that share an environment and/or a country though usually asymmetrical in terms of influence, power, and prestige).

Within the field of intercultural communication, scholars have studied how people adapt to the cultures of new environments and places (see cross-cultural adaptation). The classic situation is that of an immigrant arriving in a new country and culture and how that person adjusts to their new environment and its dominant culture.

The most prominent, but by no means only, theory of cross-cultural adaptation is Young Yun Kim's integrative theory of cross-cultural adaptation. This theory provides an overarching explanation of how immigrants successfully adapt to a new country, namely through a complex process of assimilation. Kim argues that immigrants begin to learn the customs and beliefs of a new country and gradually begin to adopt these customs and beliefs. In so doing, they also either passively or actively let go of their previous culture. In this way, immigrants attempt to become like native-born people and fit into their new culture. As described, this process goes in one direction, toward assimilation.

== Major concepts of CFT ==
Originally proposed by Eric Mark Kramer in 1992 but researched and developed by others ever since, Cultural Fusion Theory attempts to provide a better account of cross-cultural adaptation by demonstrating that the process of adaptation is multivalent, occurring simultaneously in different dimensions and produced through a multiplicity of communicative interactions. CFT, thus, tries to set aside the dualism inherent in many theories of cross-cultural adaption. In other words, the lone immigrant entering into a new host culture is a dyadic pair that is conceptually straightforward but not reflective of the multiple interactions most people have in any given day in their social word. CFT takes into account that an immigrant may enter a new host culture that has many different cultures within it, often including immigrant enclaves that continue to practice the customs and beliefs of an immigrant's original culture. This multiplicity is part of the reason that, according to CFT, it is not only the newcomer that adapts and changes but also the host culture. Importantly, these adaptations "fuse" or integrate elements of a newcomer's previous or original culture with elements of the new culture; the newcomer, thus, undergoes an intercultural transformation that yields an intercultural identity that contains, whether comfortably or in tension, elements from both cultures.

According to Kramer and Stephen Croucher's 2017 article that provided a comprehensive account of CFT, "Cultural fusion theory: An alternative to acculturation," CFT has three boundary conditions, four assumptions, and seven theoretical axioms.

=== Boundary conditions ===
The first boundary condition is that people first learn one culture (e.g., in their home country) and then learn a new one, usually as part of a change in environment. This condition highlights that a newcomer to a culture has been raised in a particular culture, which means that their attachment to their original culture is experienced as natural and permanent, even if suppressed most of the time.

The second boundary condition is that, as a consequence of being in a new environment, an immigrant or newcomer depends on their new home (i.e., depends on this new place for their livelihoods). This means that a person entering a new environment has to find a way to feed and clothe themself (i.e., meet their basic needs), so they are motivated by material needs to get along and adapt to the customs and rules of their new home.

The third boundary condition states that people new to a place, country, or culture are in communication with the people who have been living in that new place. While this may seem self-evident, part of adapting to a new environment in order to satisfy their material needs entails talking to people who are already living in the newcomer's new environment. Thus, newcomers and people in the new environment, including earlier immigrants to the new culture, are constantly interacting with each other. This provides the medium through which each group learns about each other's cultures and, in time, adapt to each other's cultures.

=== Assumptions ===
First, CFT assumes, in agreement with Kim, that people are naturally inclined to organize their lives and adapt to new challenges, environmental or otherwise. CFT also assumes that people are invested in their cultural identities (i.e., people are unlikely to abandon or ignore their culture in preference of a new one, even if doing so will lead to material or social benefits). CFT's third assumption is that cultural fusion in individual takes place because of and by means of communication. CFT's fourth and last assumption is that cultural fusion is an iterative, multifaceted process that is always in motion that can bring about significant change in individuals and their surroundings.

=== Theoretical axioms ===
CFT's first theoretical axiom is that part of cultural fusion is learning and integrating (parts of) a new culture into one's life as well as preserving customs and beliefs learned in one's previous environment. That means that, in contrast to assimilationist theories, CFT maintains that newcomers learn a new culture while also remaining invested in their first or original culture.

The second axiom states that cultural fusion leads to intercultural transformation. That is because immigrants have to maintain functional fitness (behave in ways that comport to their new surroundings) and develop confidence that they can adapt to their surroundings thus improving their psychological health. In developing functional fitness and becoming more psychologically flexible, immigrants develop an intercultural identity that allows them to identify without, however, leaving behind the culture into which they were originally socialized.

Agreeing with Kim, CFT's third axiom states intercultural transformation can be seen in better outcomes in functional fitness, psychological health, and intercultural identity.

According to CFT's fourth axiom, communication competence, or the ability to communicate effectively, is a key component of intercultural transformation, in both newcomers and the host culture.

Following the fourth axiom, CFT's fifth axiom states that engagement with communicative activities is pivotal for intercultural transformation.

CFT's sixth axiom states that a newcomer's degree of intercultural change affects and is affected by the expectations the host culture places on newcomers.

CFT's seventh and last axiom states that a newcomer's degree of intercultural change affects and is affected by their predispositions or their psychological readiness to adapt to a new culture, including learning a new language.

=== Theorems ===
CFT also has postulated 19 theorems, or testable hypotheses, that can be used to test the validity of the theory and/or expand it. For example, the first one states that the better a newcomer and a host culture can communicate with each other, the greater the likelihood of intercultural transformation. Many other theorems follow from this one, including how receptive a host culture is will have an impact on intercultural transformation and how prepared a newcomer is for their new culture will lead to intercultural transformation. While some of the theorems seem basic (the notion that better preparation will lead to greater success seems largely unassailable), their virtue is that they are all formulated in ways that they can easily be quantified and, thus, tested. Overall, the 19 theorems suggest a great deal of heuristic value (or potential usefulness) for CFT.

== Theoretical applications ==
To date, there have been several applications of CFT. Below is a non-exhaustive list of published research that has used CFT.

- An early application of CFT was used in a book-length study of relations between African American and Korean Americans (the term Cultural Fusion Theory had not yet been coined).
- In 2019, a study used CFT to examine the portrayal of Syrian refugees in Turkish media. The study of media portrayals of immigrants and refugees helps to test the validity of the role of host culture receptivity and its role in cultural fusion.
- In 2023, a research article used CFT to study the Changed Movement, a movement that espouses the use of Christianity as a method of converting LGBTQ+ people into cisgender heterosexuals. This study is an example of a novel application of CFT since it is focusing on sexuality and gender as the bases for culture. In other words, this study expands CFT beyond the typical paradigm of an immigrant adapting to a new land.
- In 2024, a study explored New Zealand as a multicultural environment and used prominent intercultural communication models, like CFT, to understand the experiences of cultural adaptation in that country.
