= Joseph Agbakoba =

Nigerian philosopher

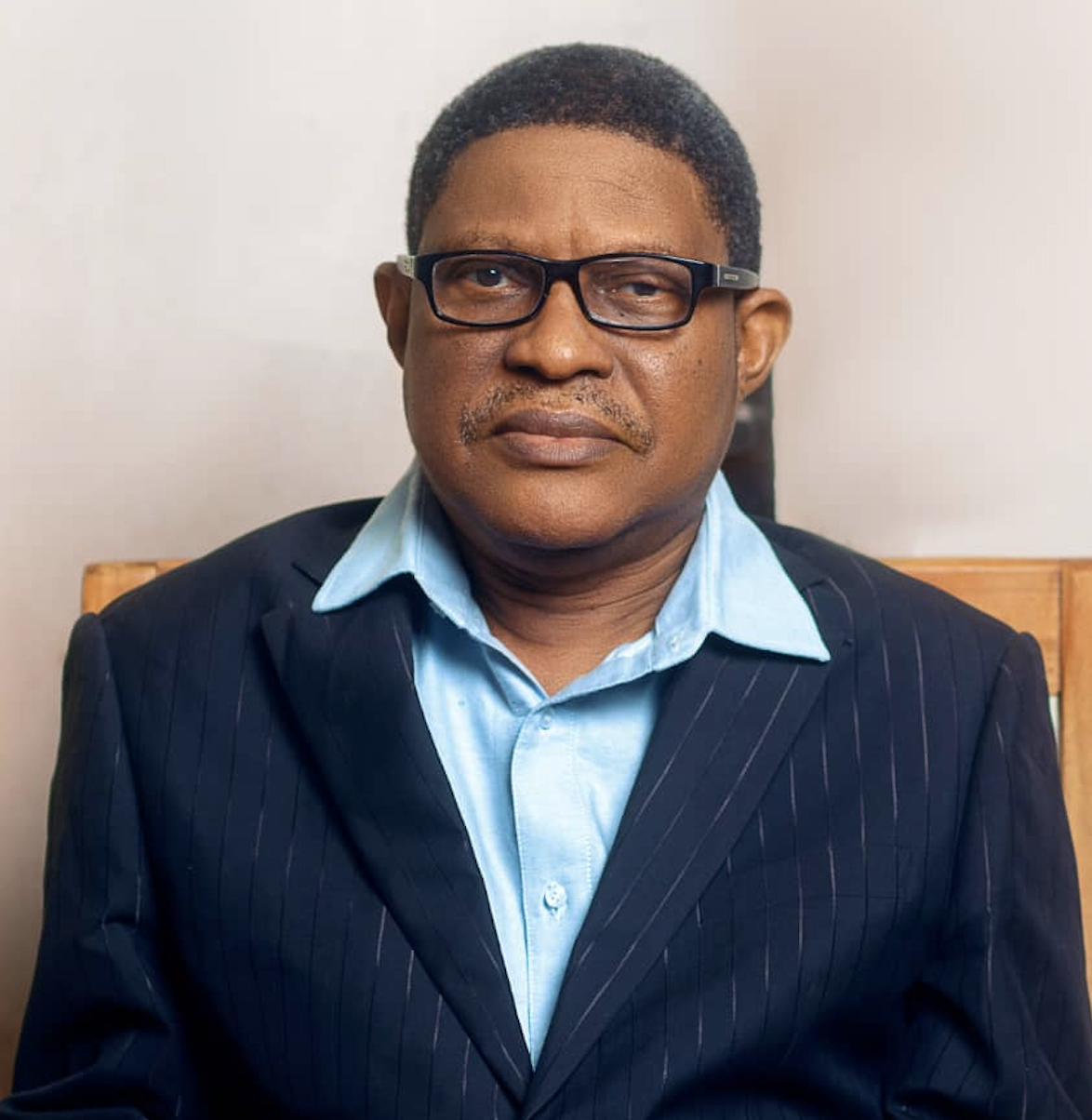
- Agbakoba in 2024
- Born: Joseph Chukwuemeka (Chemeka) Achike Anthony Agbakoba; 8 February 1961; Owerri, Nigeria
- Died: 27 December 2025 (aged 64)
- Occupations: Professor of philosophy at the University of Nigeria, Nsukka
- Known for: Development Philosophy and Ethics, Reasonabilism, Transcolonial Theory, and Afro-constructivism
- Title: Professor
- Parent(s): Vincent Chukwuemeka Agbakoba and Josephine Nwanyibuzo Agbakoba
- Awards: Georg Forster Research Award 2022

Academic background
- Education: Obafemi Awolowo University, University of Nigeria

Academic work
- Discipline: Philosopher
- Website: http://www.josephcagbakoba.com/

Joseph Chukwuemeka (Chemeka) Achike Anthony Agbakoba was a professor of practical philosophy at the University of Nigeria, Nsukka (UNN). He is best known for his work around development philosophy and ethics for Africa, and his association with reasonabilism, Afro-constructivism, transcolonial theory, and Africanity as creative self-manifestive identity, among other concepts in contemporary African thought. He was a 2022 recipient of the Georg Forster Research Award. Joseph Agbakoba died on 27 December 2025.

== Early life and education ==
Joseph Agbakoba was born in Owerri, Nigeria, son of Vincent Chukwuemeka Agbakoba, an engineer, and Josephine Nwanyibuzo Agbakoba, a school teacher who later became a dressmaker. He finished his primary education at Santa Maria Primary School, Enugu in 1972 and then proceeded to Christ the King College (CKC) Onitsha in 1973 for his secondary education. In 1978, he got admitted into the University of Ife (now Obafemi Awolowo University, Ife) where he studied history and philosophy for his Bachelor of Arts degree, and subsequently, a master's degree in philosophy. He joined the staff of the Philosophy Department at the University of Nigeria in 1992, as a junior academic. In the following years, he studied for his PhD, receiving it in 1998 from the University of Nigeria, Nsukka.

== Academic career ==
Agbakoba rose through the academic ladder at UNN to become senior lecturer in 2000 and professor in 2005. At the same university, he was head of the Department of Philosophy from 2007 to 2010; then dean of the School of General Studies from 2012 to 2013. Later, he served as the deputy vice-chancellor at Madonna University from 2013 to 2017. In the 2006/2007 academic year, he lived in Ghana as a Visiting Scholar at the University of Cape Coast.

From 2010 to 2012, he was resident in Germany as a fellow of the Alexander von Humboldt Foundation at Goethe University, Frankfurt, and again resident in Germany (2023-2024), as a Humboldt Foundation awardee at the University of Bayreuth. He has also received many short scholarships, visiting professorships, and fellowships, including the Bayreuth Academy Fellowship in the 2019/2020 academic session. He was a Research Associate at the Ali Mazrui Centre for Higher Education, University of Johannesburg, South Africa.

== Award ==
In 2022, Agbakoba received the Georg Forster Research Award. The citation for the award reads, in part, that he had "an outstanding international reputation for his work on the philosophical underpinnings of human and social development especially in Africa. He has shown not only how African values can promote development, but also which attitudes need to be cultivated to render development successful. His interdisciplinary and intercultural approach builds bridges between cultures."

== Positions held ==
- Former president of the Nigerian Philosophical Association (2008-2016).
- Member of the Committee of Directors, International Federation of Philosophical Societies (FISP) (2008-2024).
- Regional Coordinator (Africa), Council for Research in Values and Philosophy (CRVP), Washington DC.
- Vice President for Africa of Conférence Mondiale des Institutions Universitaires Catholiques de Philosophie (COMIUCAP).

== Philosophical Ideas ==
Agbakoba's philosophical approach is intercultural and cognitively progressivist, based on colligational synthesis and hybridity, especially heterosis (the form of hybrid that is more vigorous than its parent stocks). He argues that colligational (or fusional) synthesis works to bring diverse theses and anti-theses into a harmonious and well-functional whole (of many parts) using the various means of balancing, reconciling, and harmonising terms.

It contrasts with the Hegelian-Marxian dialectical synthesis in which the antithesis absorbs and annihilates the thesis as an existential entity in its march to constitute a new synthesis. Reasonabilism is the basic metaphysical pillar in Agbakoba's thoughts. It combines rationality (the principle of consistency) and enabling conative and affective states, captured in his notion of ontological beneficence which mutually and necessarily reinforce and affirm the being of each other. Reasonability in an entity/notion can be seen in the radius of consistency-beneficence it displays, that is, a combination of its internal consistency-beneficence and horizon of consistency-beneficence. Agbakoba holds, therefore, that the more reasonabilistic an agent (person or community) is, the more it can attain genuine development.

In his scheme, Afro-constructivism is the perspective that the mindset and mode of scholarship in Africa has to change from being dominantly and principally oppositional, deconstructive and productive of negative knowledge, to being colligational or fusional, integrative, constructive, positively creative and productive of positive knowledge, especially for enhancing development, which is the main challenge and existential concern of contemporary Africans. Afro-constructivism is associated with reasonabilism and epistemic creativity. The latter refers to any form of innovative or generative act that enables humans gain more truthful information (in the form of facts, insights, perspectives, principles etc.) in any sphere of human existence - from science and technology to the arts, governance, business, sports, etc. Such information can be further used to make life better for humans in specific communities and generally as the case may be.

Epistemic creativity is thus ensconced in the generative aspect of human agency and is central to the transformation and development of societies. The Afro-constructivist position advocates for conditions and processes that would enhance epistemic creativity and agential integrity in the education process and society generally. It also advocates moves away from various forms of “false consciousness about the self, its provenance and circumstances”, and manifestations of self-deception which in turn, yields false knowledge, wrong self-evaluation, wrong values and policies, inadequate interactive skills, and other negatives that have tended to destroy rather than build on the valuable deposits of colonization as well as produce counter-development rather than development.

The foregoing concepts ground trans-colonization and transcolonial theory. This implies going beyond the colonial deposit (including its cultural, and as much as possible physical, limitations and negativities) without throwing away utilizable elements of the deposit but “by appropriating them via rational evaluation, transforming and adapting them via indigenous creativity, fusing them with indigenous knowledge and creating new forms, expanding the possibilities and realities of knowledge; thus, emerging beyond both the pre-colonial and colonial starting points in an ever forward [cognitively] progressive motion.”

Agbakoba's transcolonial theory emphasises agency, its capabilities and potentials, as well as the error of seeing Africans as passive agents in the making of their own history and development (or counter-development); an error which seems also to encourage victimology. Within the framework of transcolonial thinking, Africanity (African identity) is not seen as a heritage of immutable essences, a fossilised gift of the ancestors. Heritage is important but it is not the only source of identity. There is also, more importantly for Africa currently, identity as creative self-manifestation; the process and its outcomes (or the lack therein) by which contemporaneous living generations define themselves by their creative output in all aspects of human existence for good or for bad.

For Agbakoba, Creative works can reflect the identities and experiences of the individuals who produce them. Arguing that Africans, like other peoples, should be free to draw on their own creative traditions and capacities while also incorporating influences from precolonial heritage, colonial-era developments, and other world cultures. Saying that such integration can contribute to developments in fields including music, fashion design, visual art, and the adaptation of traditional herbal practices.

== Bibliography ==
- Development and Modernity in Africa
