= Intercultural simulation =

Educational activity

Intercultural simulation is an educational activity designed to provide constructive encounters between people of more than one cultural or ethnic group. Simulations designed for this purpose have been in use since the 1970s.

== Description ==
Intercultural distinguishes itself from the term cross-cultural by asserting a contextually rich interpretative process which emphasizes interactions between and among culturally-diverse individuals. Conversely, cross-cultural communication is interested in studying how specific concepts, such as time or masculinity, are expressed and negotiated across cultures to provide a greater understanding of cultural comparison. It is therefore appropriate to apply the term intercultural to discussions of games and simulations precisely because of the conceptual emphasis on dynamic interactivity. Delving further into intercultural as a conceptual term, intercultural literacy refers to an individual's ability to interact appropriately and effectively with members of other linguistic and cultural backgrounds. Further, intercultural competence suggests the ability of an individual to adapt verbal as well as nonverbal messages to various cultural contexts. Finally, intercultural communication refers to the exchange of verbal and nonverbal messages between two or more interlocutors from dissimilar cultures or co-cultures.

It is important to define game and simulation. Viewing games as systems of interaction, playing is a form of contact by interaction given the central role of play within games. Prior to exploring specific differences between digital and non-digital games and simulations, it is advisable to understand the simulation on a conceptual level. Simulations demand the use of rules. In the digital realm, simulations employ physical laws to allow for certain types of interaction. In non-digital simulation, rules are similarly necessary if only to provide parameters of behavior. In both cases, simulations use rules in order to affect how the individual is able to perform within its constraints. It is not necessary to win or lose: the emphasis inherent to any simulation is experience. Unlike games which position individuals in situations with opportunities to succeed or fail and whose outcomes determine the length of the game, simulations can actually persist without ending. In contrast to both terms, a simulation game is a delicate educational combination of both wherein experience is paramount to its design and appreciation and the player/learner must gather points or credits or similar in order to proceed to further levels.

Here the term "digital" generally refers to computers, game consoles, or online-based games or simulations. In contrast, "non-digital" refers to card games, board games, or other non-electronic games or simulations. Most recently virtual environments have attracted attention given their potential for increasing intercultural literacy among users. Similar to virtual worlds, virtual environments, which largely function as interactive collaborative and training spaces, can also exist as a computer-based simulated environment. Virtual environments often allow for custom-made training solutions which can be used to promote intercultural competence. Active Worlds and Second Life, both online virtual worlds, have been the focus of scholarly investigations as to whether individuals can gain intercultural literacy and competence from such immersive learning environments. Findings generally point to their potential for enabling culturally and linguistically diverse individuals to interact with one another in digital spaces.

== See also ==
- Intercultural competence
- Intercultural dialogue
