= Ike Odimegwu =

Nigerian philosopher

- Born: Obiaruku, Delta State, Nigeria
- Education: University of Nigeria, Nsukka
- Occupations: philosopher; writer; educator
- Years active: 1991–present

Ike Ferdinand Odimegwu is a Nigerian professor of philosophy and political philosopher.

== Early life ==
He was born at Obiaruku, a city in Delta State, southern Nigeria. He was a student under the tutelage of Theophilus Okere, a renowned Nigerian philosopher at Owerri, the capital of Imo State, Nigeria. He later obtained a Master of Arts degree from the University of Nigeria.

== Career ==
He began his academic career at Federal College of Education, Umunze, Nigeria, before in 1999 joining the services of Nnamdi Azikiwe University, where he later served as Head of Philosophy Department and Chairman of the Faculty of Arts Welfare Committee. He also served as Chairman of the Academic Staff Union of Universities (ASUU), Nnamdi Azikiwe University Chapter. He is the incumbent Coordinator of ASUU, Owerri zone.

== Membership ==
He is a member of several academic associations, including:

- Nigerian Philosophical Association (NPA)
- International Society for African Philosophy and Studies (ISAPS)

== Selected publications ==
He has authored and co-authored several books and journals:

- Globalization and African Identity (2006) in M. F. Asiegbu and J. A. Agbakoba (eds.) Philosophy and Praxis in Africa, Ibadan: Hope Publications, 309-328
- The Concept of Development (2006) in O.A.U. Nnedum, E.N. Obianyo and J.O. Ezeokana (eds) Current Trends in Social Science and Management Thoughts. Enugu: John Jacobs Classic Publishers, 50–63.
- Nigerian Nationalism and the Crisis of Patriotism: Conceptual Dialogics (2006), in Ike Odimegwu (ed.) Philosophy and Africa: (2006) UNESCO World Philosophy Day @ UNIZIK vol 1, Amawbia: Lumos Publishers, 203–213.
- Nze on Development (2007) in Ike Odimegwu (ed) Perspectives on African Communalism Victoria: Trafford Publishing. (Canada). 201- 217.
- African Communalism and the Search for African Personhood (2007) in Ike Odimegwu (ed) Perspectives on African Communalism Victoria: Trafford Publishing. (Canada). 201- 217.
