= Weisman Art Museum =

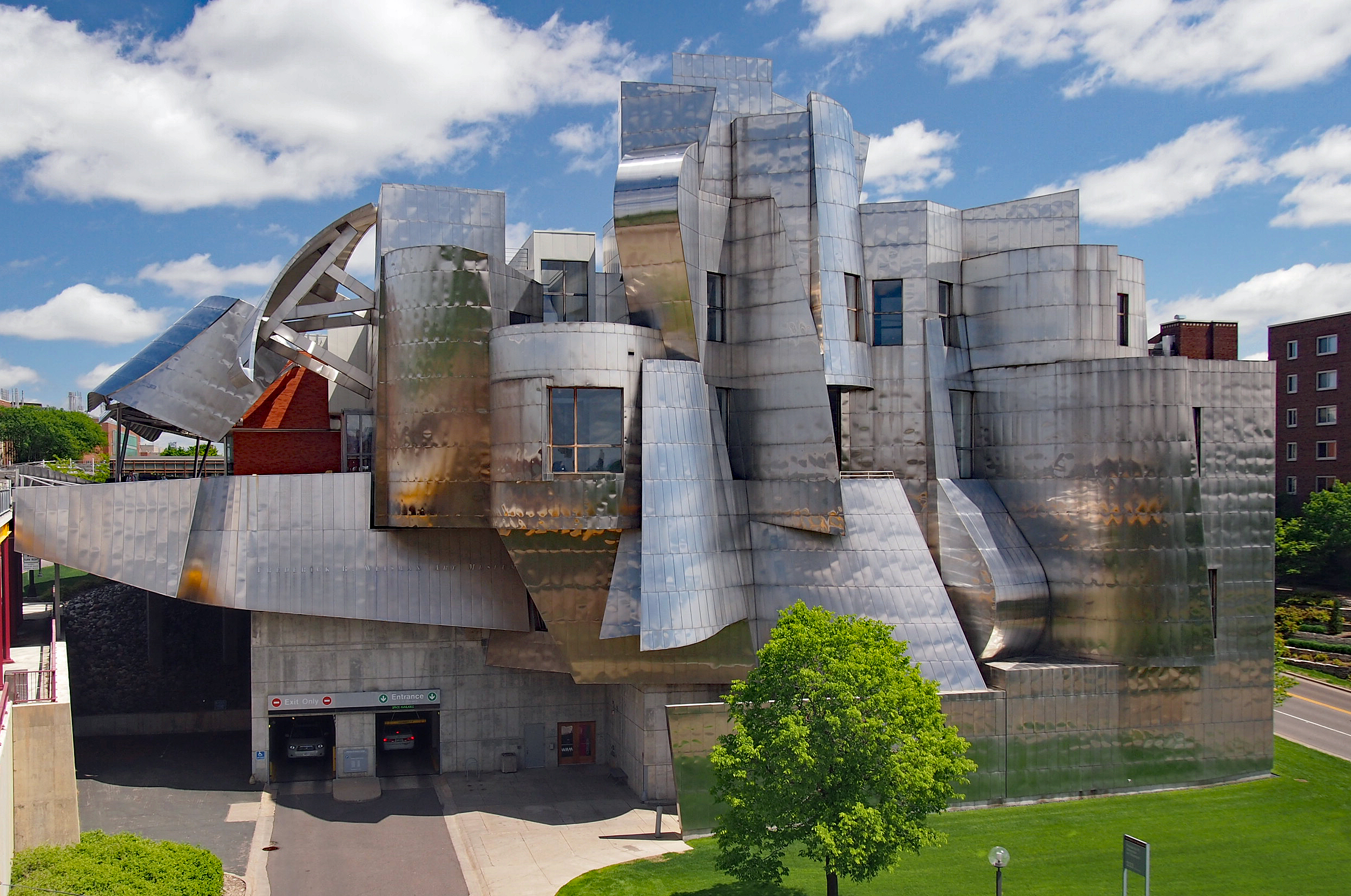
- West facade as viewed from the Washington Avenue Bridge
- Established: 1934
- Location: 333 East River Road; Minneapolis, MN 55455
- Coordinates: 44°58′22″N 93°14′17″W
- Type: Art museum
- Collection size: 20,000+
- Director: Alejandra Peña-Gutiérrez
- Architects: Frank Gehry / MSR Design, Minneapolis / Hammel, Green and Abrahamson, Minneapolis
- Website: wam.umn.edu

Weisman Art Museum is an art museum at the University of Minnesota in Minneapolis, Minnesota. Founded in 1934 as University Gallery, the museum was originally housed in an upper floor of the university's Northrop Auditorium. In 1993, the museum moved to its current building, designed by the Canadian-born American architect Frank Gehry, and renamed in honor of art collector and philanthropist Frederick R. Weisman. Widely known as a "modern art museum," its 20,000+ acquisitions include large collections of traditional Korean furniture and modern American art, including collections of work by Marsden Hartley, Alfred Maurer, Charles Biederman.

== Frederick Rand Weisman ==
Frederick Rand Weisman (April 27, 1912 – September 11, 1994) was a Minneapolis native who became well known as an art collector in Los Angeles. In 1982 Weisman purchased an estate in the Holmby Hills area of Los Angeles that would serve as a showcase for his personal collection of 20th-century art. When he opened the art collection to the public, he wanted to share the experience of living with art, rather than the usual, more formal protocol of seeing art in a gallery or museum. The estate remains the home of the Frederick R. Weisman Art Foundation to this day.

The Weisman Foundation estate is a two-story Mediterranean Revival house designed in the late 1920s by Los Angeles architect Gordon B. Kaufmann. The Weisman home exhibits the fine craftsmanship characteristic of the period, including custom decorative treatments on the walls and ceilings. Today the foundation estate, annex, and surrounding gardens are made accessible to the public by appointment only.

Another museum bearing Weisman's name, the Frederick R. Weisman Museum of Art, is located on the campus of Pepperdine University in Malibu, California.

== Museum building ==
The current museum building was designed by architect Frank Gehry with MSR Design as architect of record and completed in November 1993. It is one of the major landmarks on the University of Minnesota campus, situated on a bluff overlooking the Mississippi River at the east end of the Washington Avenue Bridge. The abstract structure is considered highly significant because it was built prior to the widespread use of computer aided design in architecture.

The building presents two faces, depending on which side it is viewed from. To the south and east, it presents a brick facade that blends with the historic buildings along Northrop Mall. To the north and west, it is an abstraction of a fish and waterfall in curving and angular brushed steel sheets. The stainless steel skin was fabricated and installed by the A. Zahner Company, a frequent collaborator with Gehry's office.

The museum received a major addition, also designed by Frank Gehry, in 2011. HGA Architects and Engineers served as local consultants for the project.

== Gallery ==
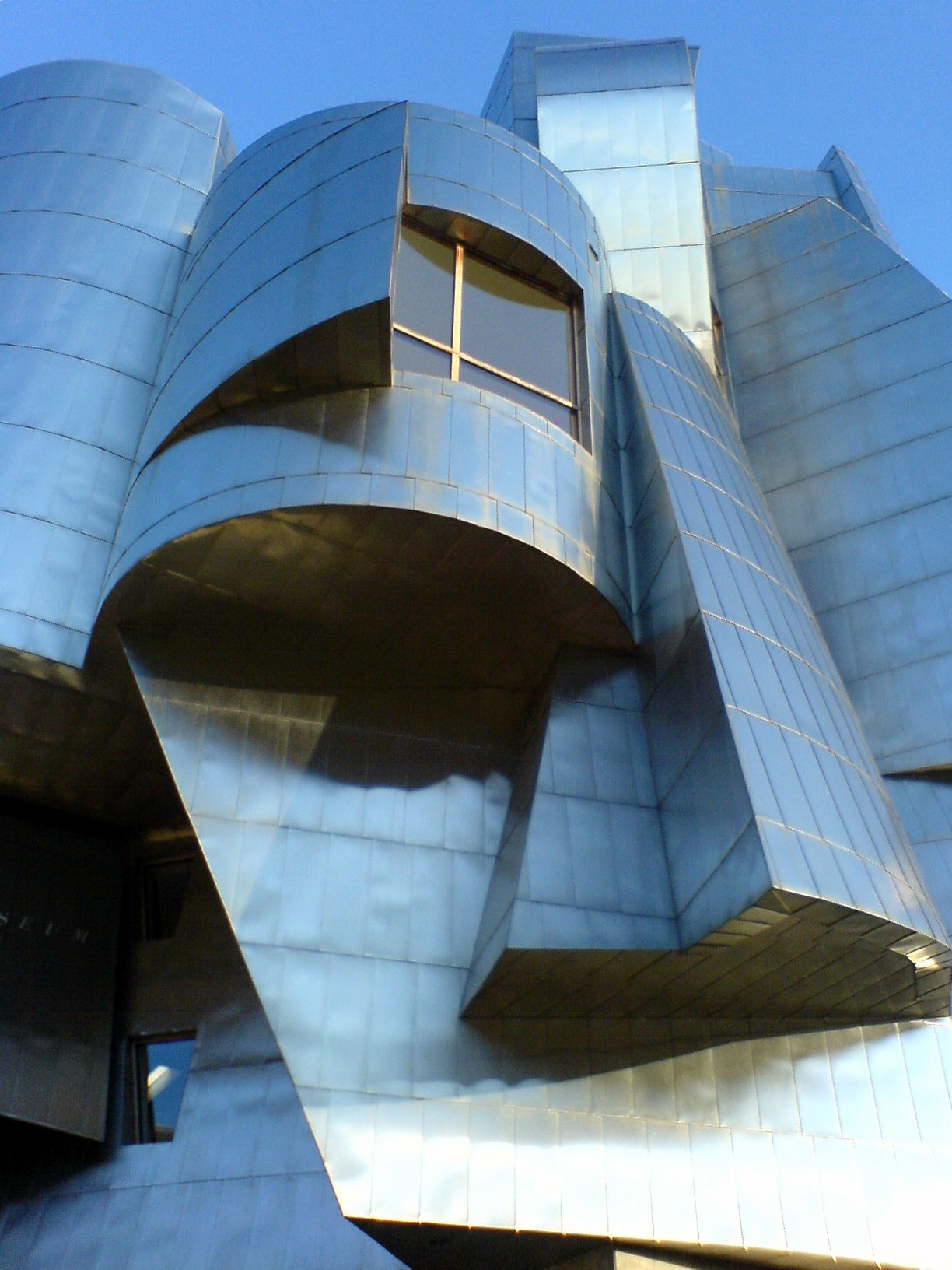
A closeup of the Frank Gehry-designed building

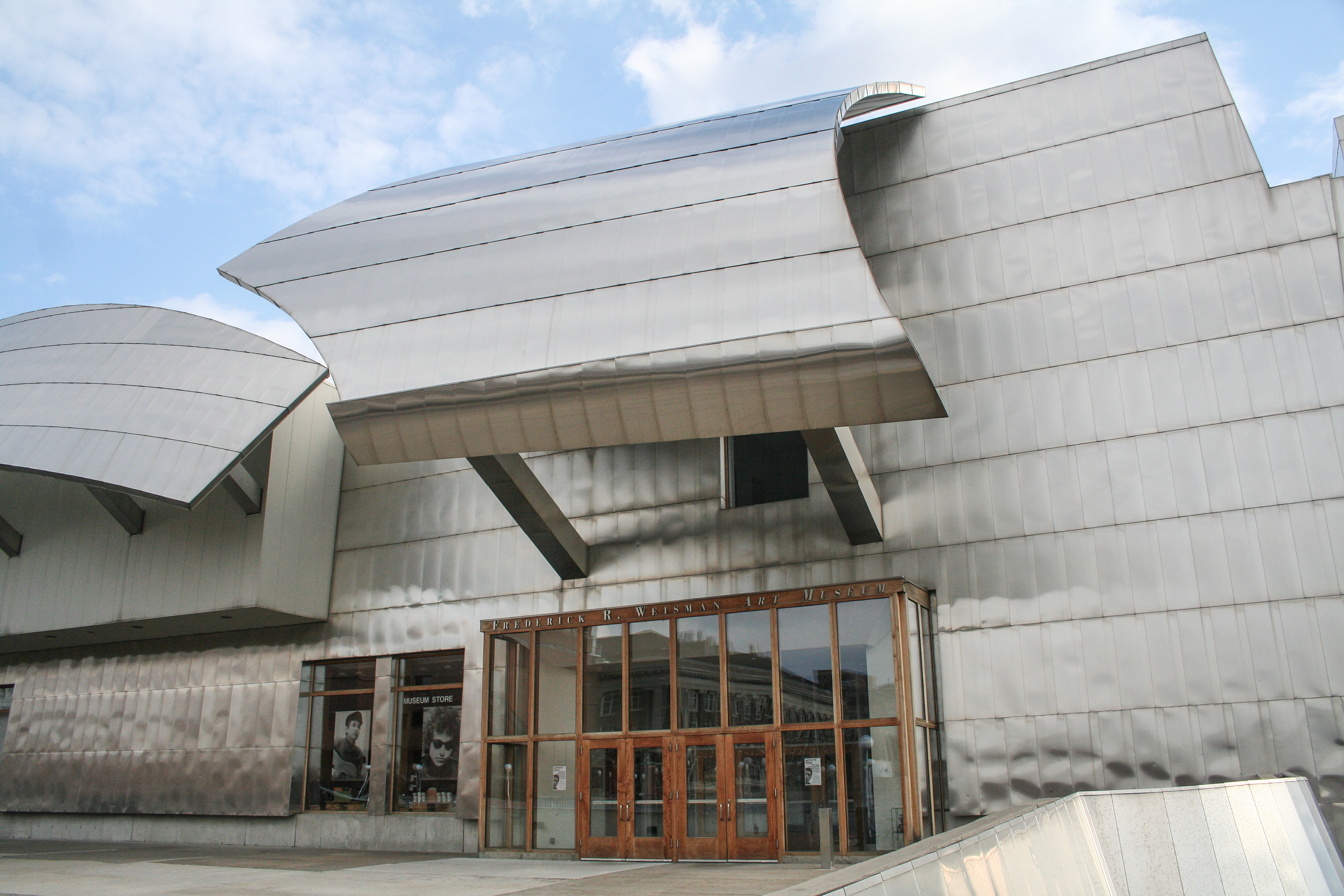
Main entrance

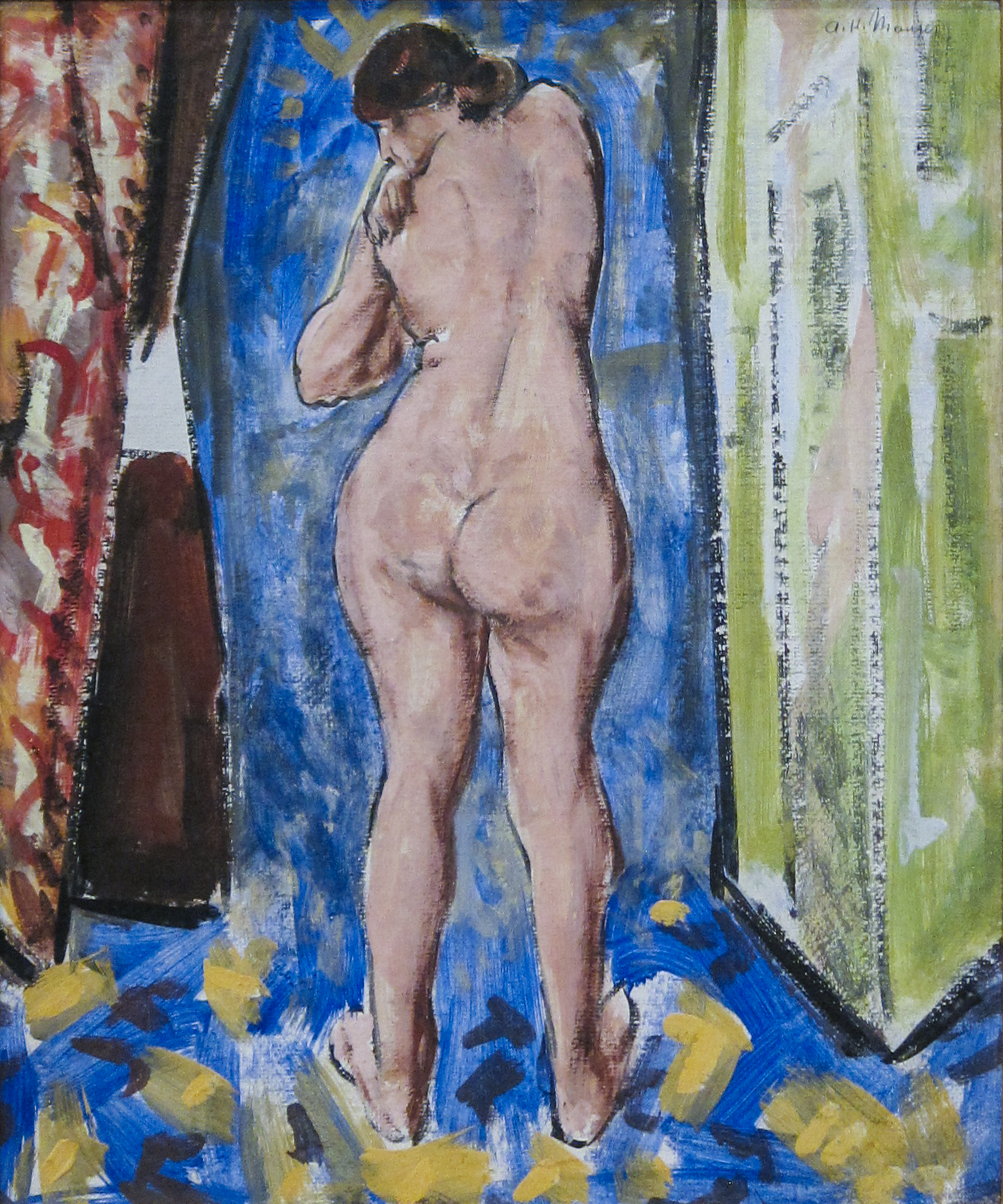
Alfred Maurer's Standing Female Nude (1927-1928) is part of the museum's collection

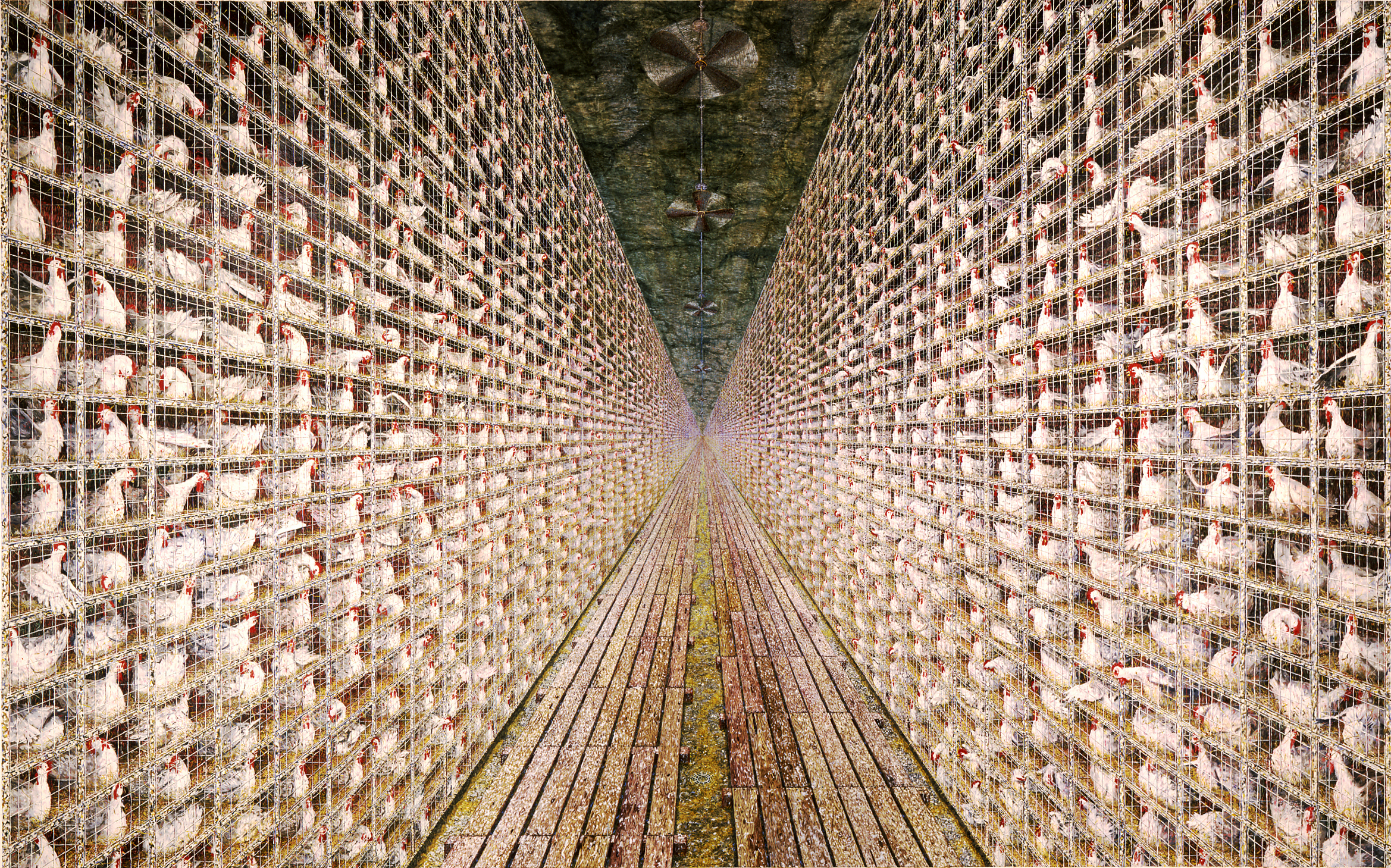
Doug Argue, Untitled, 1994

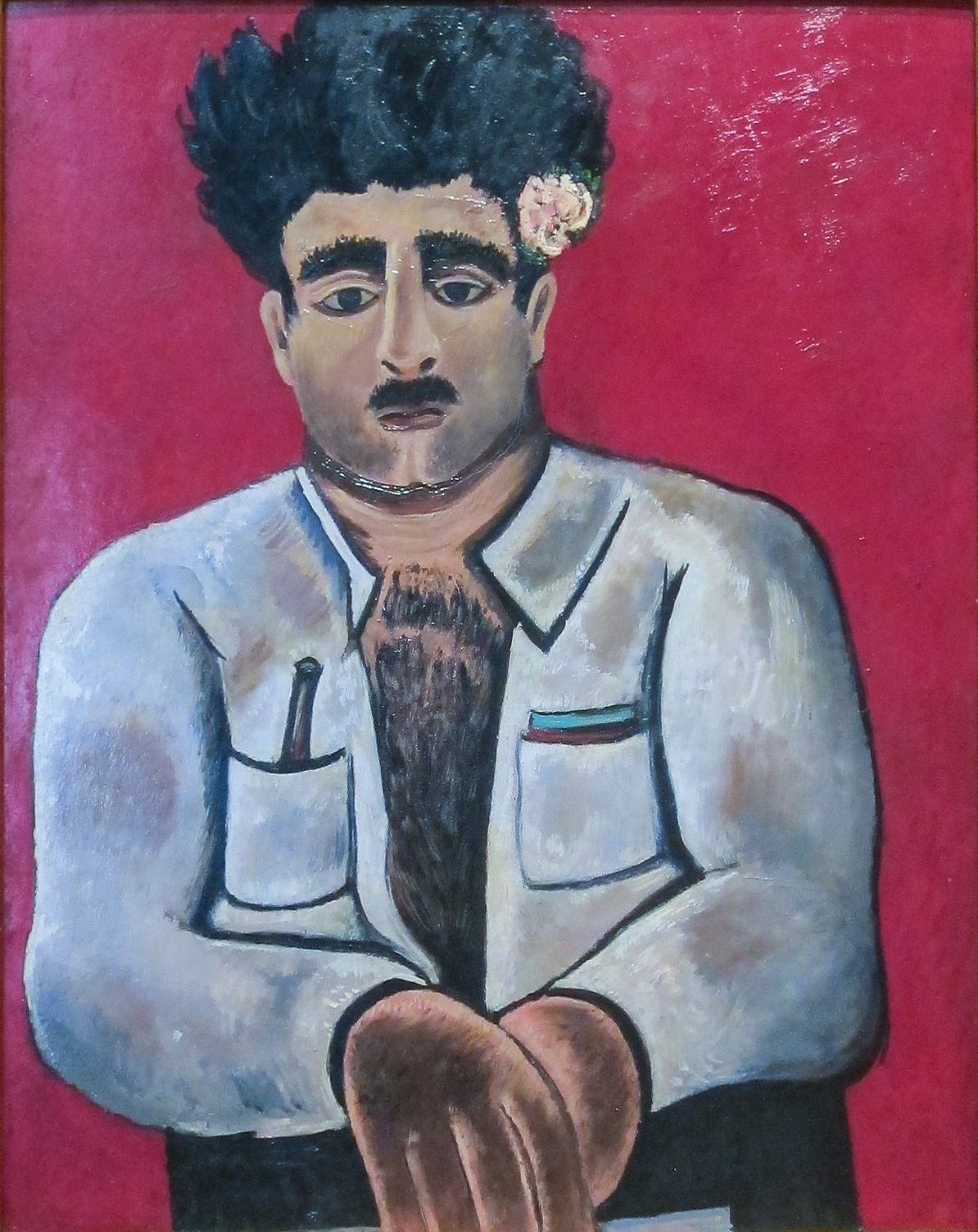
Adelard the Drowned, Master of the "Phantom", Marsden Hartley, c. 1938-1939

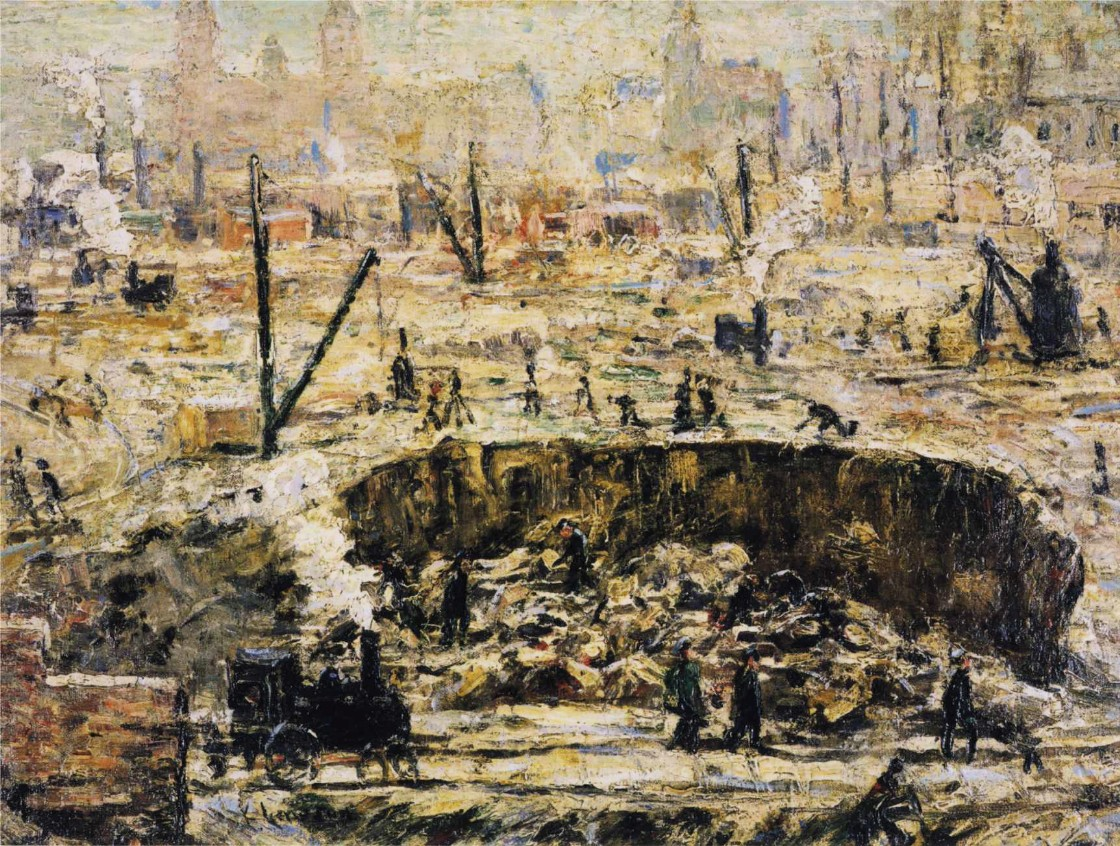
Excavation - Penn Station, Ernest Lawson, 1906

== See also ==
- List of works by Frank Gehry
