= Charles Biederman =

American artist (1906–2004)

- Self-portrait (1934)
- Born: Karl Joseph Biederman; August 23, 1906; Cleveland
- Died: December 26, 2004 (aged 98); Red Wing, Minnesota
- Education: Cleveland Art Institute, School of the Art Institute of Chicago
- Known for: Abstract painter, sculptor

Charles Biederman, born Karel Joseph Biederman (August 23, 1906 – December 26, 2004), was an American abstract artist who lived in Chicago, New York City, and Paris before settling in Red Wing, Minnesota.

== Biography ==
Born in Cleveland in 1906 to Czech immigrant parents, Biederman studied at the Cleveland Art Institute before enrolling at the School of the Art Institute of Chicago (SAIC). At SAIC, Biederman received the prestigious Paul Trebeilcock Prize. Despite this, he dropped out of school in 1929 due to ideological differences with the faculty.

In 1934, Biederman moved to New York City. In March 1936, he was included in the show "Five Contemporary American Concretionists" at Paul Reinhardt Gallery in New York. The show also featured Alexander Calder, John Ferren, George L.K. Morris, and Charles Green Shaw. Together with a concurrent solo exhibition at Pierre Matisse Gallery in New York, the exhibition helped establish Biederman's reputation as an important modern artist. Despite a growing recognition of his work, Biederman also gained a reputation for being arrogant, which would affect his relationships with curators and other artists.

Biederman spent nine months in Paris from October 1936 through the middle of 1937. There he met leading artists of the time, including Picasso, Mondrian, and Miró, and was specifically influenced by the artist Fernand Léger. Eventually, Biederman rejected Léger's work as well, moving towards strictly geometric, completely abstract forms. In the catalog for Biederman's 1976 retrospective at the Minneapolis Institute of Arts, Leif Sjoberg writes, "In January of 1937 he abandoned biological forms, seeing the organic and the geometric as a conflict of forms. Thus he began to work for very precise, geometrically derived shapes." The artist Paul Cézanne is also cited as a major influence on Biederman's work. Unlike Cézanne, however, Biederman abandoned painting early in his career, focusing on three-dimensional reliefs after 1937.

Between 1937 and 1941, Biederman lived in New York City and Chicago and continued to explore the ideas developed in Paris. He made relief constructions, often incorporating non-traditional materials such as string, wire, and glass panes. He married in 1941 and moved to Red Wing, Minnesota in 1942 with his wife, Mary Moore Biederman. Red Wing was the home of Mary's brother-in-law and sister, John and Eugenie (Moore) Anderson. John was independently wealthy at the time, and was an important patron for Biederman from 1931 until 1953, helping to financially support him and encouraging his work. Biederman's farm near Red Wing influenced his work and his ideas about the relationship between art and nature. In the 1950s, he introduced the term Structurism to describe his vividly painted three-dimensional geometric reliefs, in order to distinguish them from Constructivism and De Stijl.

There was a major Biederman show at the Walker Art Center in Minneapolis in 1965. Then in 1976 the Minneapolis Institute of Art held a retrospective of the artist. These two exhibitions helped to solidify Biederman's place within American Abstract art.

The New York gallerist Grace Borgenicht visited Biederman in Red Wing in 1979. Borgenicht represented Biederman's work for more than a decade, and he had several solo exhibitions in her New York Gallery between 1980 and 1991.

In addition to creating art, Biederman wrote extensively, self-publishing more than a dozen books about art. He also carried on a long correspondence with the physicist David Bohm. The letters exchanged by Biederman and Bohm were published as The Bohm-Biederman Correspondence: Creativity in Art and Science.

Charles Biederman died at home in 2004 at the age of 98. His estate was given to the Weisman Art Museum at the University of Minnesota, which has organized traveling exhibitions of Biederman's work.

== Public collections ==
Biederman's work is in many public collections, including:

Albright-Knox Art Gallery, Buffalo, New York; The Blanton Museum of Art, University of Texas at Austin, Texas; Carnegie Museum of Art, Pittsburgh, Pennsylvania; Chazen Museum of Art, University of Wisconsin, Madison; The Art Institute of Chicago, Illinois; Dallas Museum of Fine Arts, Texas; Detroit Institute of Arts, Michigan; University of East Anglia, Norwich, England; Hirshhorn Museum and Sculpture Garden, Washington, D.C.; The Hunter Museum of American Art, Chattanooga, Tennessee; Lowe Art Museum, University of Miami, Coral Gables, Florida; The Metropolitan Museum of Art, New York; Museum of Fine Arts, Boston; Minneapolis Institute of Art, Minnesota; The Museum of Modern Art, New York; Newark Museum, New Jersey; Philadelphia Museum of Art, Pennsylvania; Tate Modern, London, England; Walker Art Center, Minneapolis, Minnesota; Frederick R. Weisman Art Museum, University of Minnesota, Minneapolis; and the Whitney Museum of American Art, New York, among others.

His archive, including notebooks, sketches, and models, can be found at the Weisman Art Museum in Minneapolis.
