= Participation =

Participation or participant may refer to:

== Politics ==
- Participation (decision making), mechanisms for people to participate in social decisions
- Civic participation, engagement by the citizens in government
- e-participation, citizen participation in e-government using information and communications technology

== Finance ==
- Participation (ownership), an ownership interest in a mortgage or other loan
- Participation, the amount of benefit in a bond plus option due to the performance of an underlying asset
- Capital participation, ownership of shares in a company or project

== Other uses ==
- Participation (philosophy), the inverse of inherence: if an attribute inheres in a subject, then the subject participates in the attribute
- Participant Media, an American film-production company founded in 2004
