= Felix Odimegwu =

Engr. Dr. Felix Chiedu Odimegwu
- Born: Anambra State
- Education: Bayero University Kano, Nnamdi Azikiwe University Awka
- Occupation: Environnementalist/Politician
- Organization: Commissioner of Environment Anambra State
- Political party: All Progressives Grand Alliance (APGA)

Felix Chiedu Odimegwu (born March 20, 1976) is a Nigerian mechanical engineer, environmentalist and administrator. He is the Commissioner for Environment, Anambra State.

== Early life and education ==
Felix was born to Chief Sir Felix Odimegwu and Lady Grace Odimegwu in Onitsha, Anambra state. He is the fifth child in a family of nine. He attended All Saints Primary School and Dennis Memorial Grammar School (DMGS) all in Onitsha, Anambra State.

He went further to obtain a degree in Mechanical Engineering from Bayero University Kano, graduating with second class honors, upper division. Also, he got his M.Sc. and Ph.D. all in Mechanical Engineering from Nnamdi Azikiwe University, Awka Anambra State.

== Career ==
Before venturing into politics, Odimegwu built a career as an entrepreneur and industry leader in Anambra State. He was chairman and CEO of several companies, including Omus Oil Ltd., Dover Industries Ltd., and Omus Properties and Estates, focusing on oil, manufacturing, and real estate.

== Political career ==
Odimegwu ventured into politics, first as Chairman of Coordinators for Senator Andy Uba (Anambra South Senatorial Zone) and aspiring for a seat in the Anambra State House of Assembly. This continued until 2022, when Prof. Charles Soludo the governor of Anambra State appointed him the Commissioner of Environment, Anambra State.

== Achievements as Commissioner of Environment ==
- He launched the "All Anambra Communities Plastic Waste Recovery Challenge" (from 2023 and still ongoing), targeting 10,000 tons of plastic waste across 179 communities in Anambra State to promote recycling, job creation, and environmental cleanup
- In 2025, he led a delegation to the Netherlands for the "Netherlands-Nigeria Innovation Exchange" to adopt advanced waste management technologies.
- He addressed erosion threats in 160 out of Anambra's 179 communities through community-driven programs and rapid response under the Nigeria Erosion and Watershed Management Project (NEWMAP). He also declared deforestation, tree felling without replanting, and bush burning as serious crimes.
- He flagged off initiatives like "Keep Okija Clean" (2025) in partnership with NGOs such as Obijackson Foundation, donating vehicles and employing street sweepers. He also collaborated with comedians and community leaders for awareness campaigns on environmental cleanliness. Most importantly, he directed residents to repaint dilapidated buildings in major cities (Onitsha, Awka, Nnewi) starting from July 2025 under the Anambra State Environmental Management Law 2024
- He partnered with SIDEC and TJ&GP for tax compliance in markets (2025) and the Dutch Consulate for circular economy hubs. Also, he led riverbank cleanups in Otuocha (2025) to protect aquatic ecosystems. He also advocated for stakeholders' compliance to mitigate flooding, emphasizing urban planning and waste sorting

== Awards and recognitions ==
- Nigeria Society of Engineers (NSE) Awka Branch Award (2023) for contributions to engineering and environmental initiatives
- His efforts earned national recognition in 2025, with the Federal Minister of Environment praising Anambra as a "national benchmark" for climate adaptation
- He also holds traditional titles, including member of Otu Nze na Ozo Ezinifite, Nwadikannia of Umueje, and Okpara Nnanyelugo of Ezinifite

== Personal life ==
Odimegwu is married to Barrister Ugochi Precious Odimegwu, and they have five children.
