= Grand Rapids Art Museum =

Art museum in Grand Rapids, Michigan

Coordinates: 42.9650°N 85.6714°W

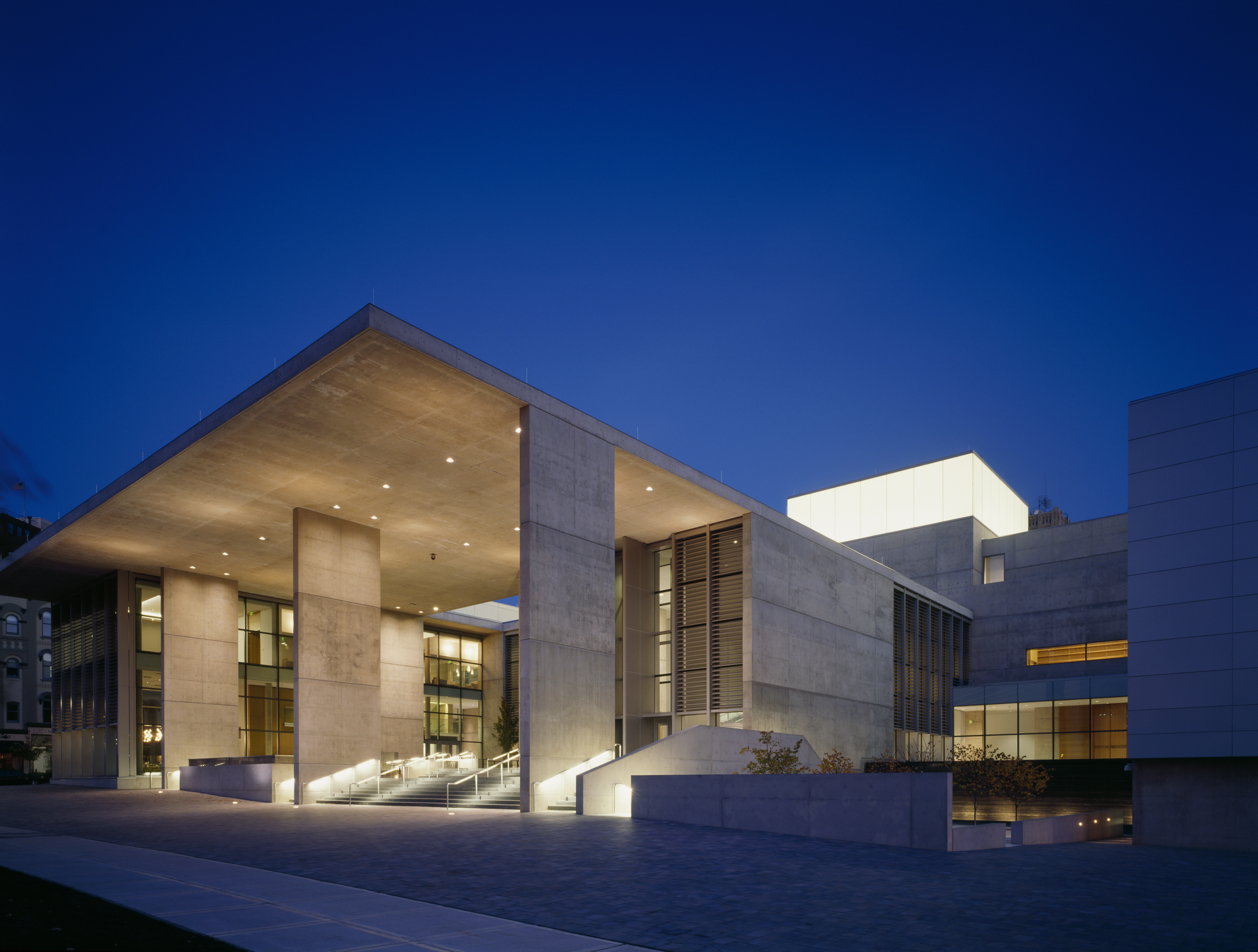
- Established: 1910
- Location: 101 Monroe Center Grand Rapids, Michigan 49503
- Visitors: 255,000 (estimate, 2010): Ranked 8th largest cultural institution in Michigan based on 2010 attendance figures
- Directors: Cindy Foley, Director and CEO
- Architects: Munkenbeck+Marshall Architects, 2002-2004 & Kulapat Yantrasast of wHY Architecture, 2004-completion
- Website: www.artmuseumgr.org

The Grand Rapids Art Museum (GRAM) is an art museum located in Grand Rapids, Michigan, United States, with collections ranging from Renaissance to Modern Art and special collections on 19th and 20th-century European and American art. Its holdings include notable modern art works such as Richard Diebenkorn’s 1963 Ingleside. The museum has in its collection 5,000 works of art, including over 3,500 prints, drawings and photographs.

== History ==
The museum was founded in 1910 under the name Grand Rapids Art Gallery, which was soon altered to its present name. Initially based in a former residence at 230 Fulton Street, it moved to the historic Federal Building on Pearl Street in 1981.

In 2004, construction began on a new green museum building, which was to be LEED certified. The 125,000 square feet (11,600 m^{2}) building, which features 20,000 square feet (1,900 m^{2}) of gallery and exhibition space, has been certified LEED Gold. London-based Munkenbeck+Marshall Architects was appointed architect for the new building in 2002 and developed the design from initial concept to construction document phase. In summer 2004, the museum board terminated Munkenbeck+Marshall's involvement and hired architect Kulapat Yantrasast of wHY Architecture to complete the project.

In 2025, it was announced that the museum was approved for $2M in state funding for critical infrastructure upgrades.

== Artists ==
Several artists have displayed their work in the museum, such as Samuel Yellin, Frederick Carl Frieseke, Harriet Whitney Frishmuth, Doug Argue and Ryan Spencer Reed, among others.
