= Intercultural communication =

Discipline that studies communication across different cultures and social groups

Intercultural communication is a discipline that studies communication across different cultures and social groups, or how culture affects communication. It describes the wide range of communication processes and problems that naturally appear within an organization or social context made up of individuals from different religious, social, ethnic, and educational backgrounds. In this sense, it seeks to understand how people from different countries and cultures act, communicate, and perceive the world around them. Intercultural communication focuses on the recognition and respect of those with cultural differences. The goal is mutual adaptation between two or more distinct cultures which leads to biculturalism/multiculturalism rather than complete assimilation. It promotes the development of cultural sensitivity and allows for empathic understanding across different cultures.

== Description ==
Intercultural communication is the idea of knowing how to communicate in different parts of the world. Intercultural communication uses theories within groups of people to achieve a sense of cultural diversity. This is in the hopes of people being able to learn new things from different cultures. The theories used give people an enhanced perspective on when it is appropriate to act in situations without disrespecting the people within these cultures; it also enhances their perspective on achieving cultural diversity through the ideas of intercultural communication.

Many people in intercultural business communication argue that culture determines how individuals encode messages, what medium they choose for transmitting them, and the way messages are interpreted. With regard to intercultural communication proper, it studies situations where people from different cultural backgrounds interact. Aside from language, intercultural communication focuses on social attributes, thought patterns, and the cultures of different groups of people. It also involves understanding the different cultures, languages and customs of people from other countries.

Learning the tools to facilitate cross-cultural interaction is the subject of cultural agility, a term presently used to design a complex set of competencies required to allow an individual or an organization to perform successfully in cross-cultural situations.

Intercultural communication plays a role in social sciences such as anthropology, cultural studies, linguistics, psychology, and communication studies. Intercultural communication is also referred to as the base for international businesses. Several cross-cultural service providers assist with the development of intercultural communication skills. Research is a major part of the development of intercultural communication skills. Intercultural communication is in a way the 'interaction with speakers of other languages on equal terms and respecting their identities'.

Identity and culture are also studied within the discipline of communication to analyze how globalization influences ways of thinking, beliefs, values, and identity within and between cultural environments. Intercultural communication scholars approach theory with a dynamic outlook and do not believe culture can be measured nor that cultures share universal attributes. Scholars acknowledge that culture and communication shift along with societal changes and theories should consider the constant shifting and nuances of society.

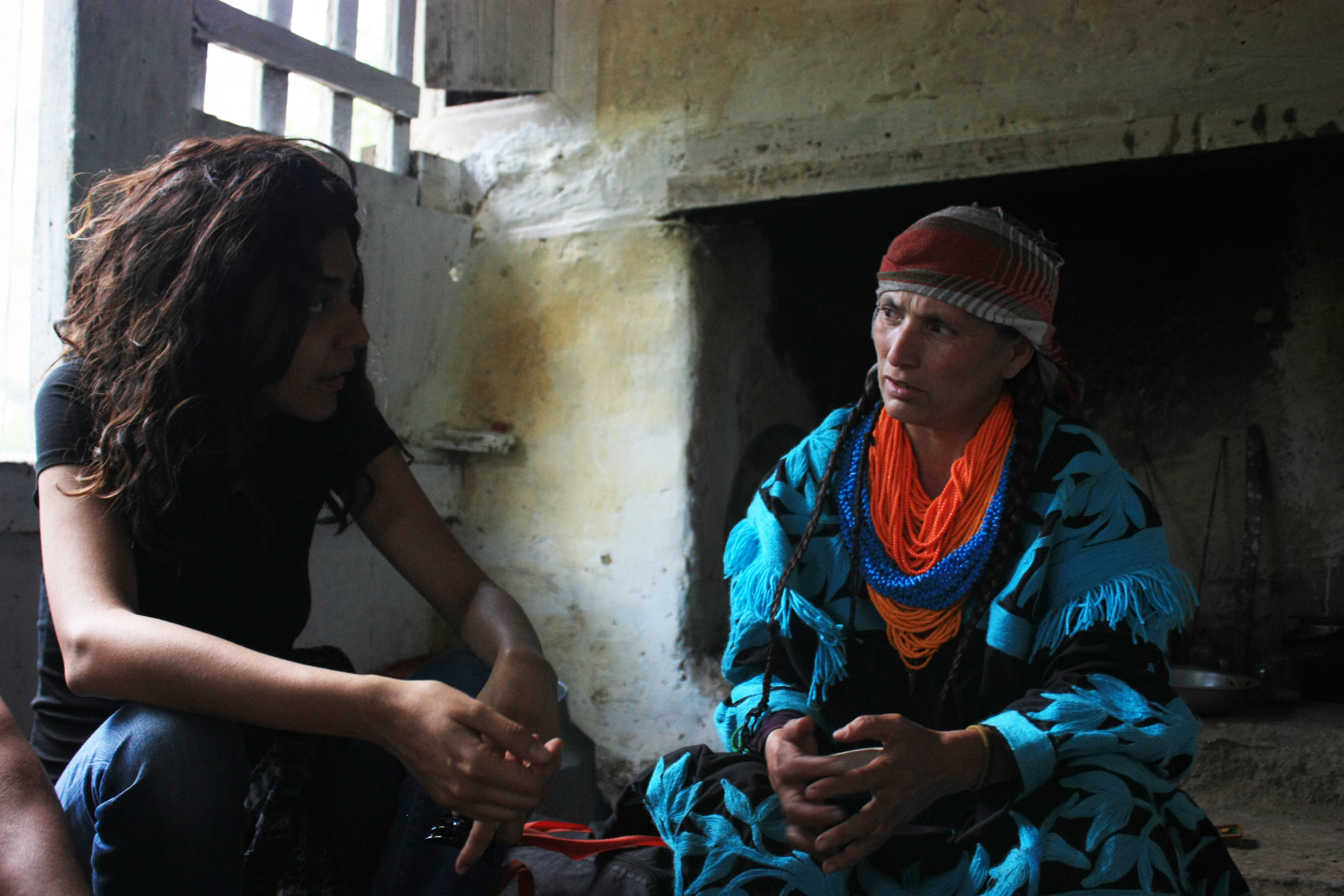
Two women communicating beyond language

The study of intercultural communication requires intercultural understanding. Intercultural understanding is the ability to understand and value cultural differences. Language is an example of an important cultural component that is linked to intercultural understanding.

Intercultural communication is something that is not just needed in the United States, but it is also needed in many other parts of the world. Wherever intercultural communication is, it helps to not only create behaviors between domestic and international contexts but also becomes a shared experience for all.

== Theories ==
The following types of theories can be distinguished in different strands: focus on effective outcomes, on accommodation or adaptation, on identity negotiation and management, on communication networks, on acculturation and adjustment.

=== Social engineering effective outcomes ===
- Cultural convergence
  - The theory that when two cultures come together, similarities in ideas and aspects will become more prevalent as members of the two cultures get to know one another. In a relatively closed social system, in which communication among members is unrestricted, the system as a whole will tend to converge over time toward a state of greater cultural uniformity. The system will tend to diverge toward diversity when communication is restricted.
- Communication accommodation theory
  - Communication accommodation theory (CAT) is the use of linguistic and nonverbal behaviors to increase or decrease the communicative distance between people. In general socioliguntics and interpersonal communication, the formulation addresses how speakers change their speaking style, tone of voice, accent, or dialect to accommodate to another person within a particular context. Similar to "code switching", speakers differ their communicative behavior between settings to compromise when they wish to agree and be understood(convergence), and when they wish to differentiate and accentuate group distinctiveness(divergence). Cindy Gallois, Tanya Ogay, and Howard Giles (2005) argue that this formulation serves to explain and predict why, when, and how people change their speech behavior in social interactions, and the interpersonal and intergroup consequences of those changes..
- Intercultural adaptation
  - Intercultural adaptation is the idea that after living in a culture for an extended period of time, people will start to develop the ideas, rules, values, among other themes of that culture. Adaptation theories conclude that in order to adapt, immigrants need to fully engage in changing one's self beliefs to that of the society's majority. To elaborate, for example, while someone lives abroad it is imperative they are ready to change in order to live cohesively with their new culture. By understanding intercultural competence, we know that people have an understanding of what it takes to thrive in a culture, by following the norms and ideals that are presented.
  - Intercultural adaptation involves learned communicative competence. Communicative competence is defined as thinking, feeling, and pragmatically behaving in ways defined as appropriate by the dominant mainstream culture. Communication competence is an outcomes-based measure conceptualized as functional/operational conformity to environmental criteria such as working conditions. Beyond this, adaptation means "the need to conform" to mainstream "objective reality" and "accepted modes of experience".
  - Cultural adaptation is the process in which individuals are able to maintain stability and reestablish with their environment while in unfamiliar cultural environments. Intercultural adaptation is a two-way process, this is between the host culture as well as the individuals outside/home culture. This is based on whether the host culture is willing to adapt, adopt cultural sensitivity, and/or adopt some aspects of the incoming individual's culture. Intercultural adaptation is a two-way process.
- Co-cultural theory
  - Co-cultural theory is the idea pertaining to a group of people that someone belongs to, with people from different parts of the world sharing characteristics of one another.
  - In its most general form, co-cultural communication refers to interactions among underrepresented and dominant group members. Co-cultures include but are not limited to people of color, women, people with disabilities, gay men and lesbians, and those in the lower social classes. Co-cultural theory, as developed by Mark P. Orbe, looks at the strategic ways in which co-cultural group members communicate with others. In addition, a co-cultural framework provides an explanation for how different persons communicate based on six factors.

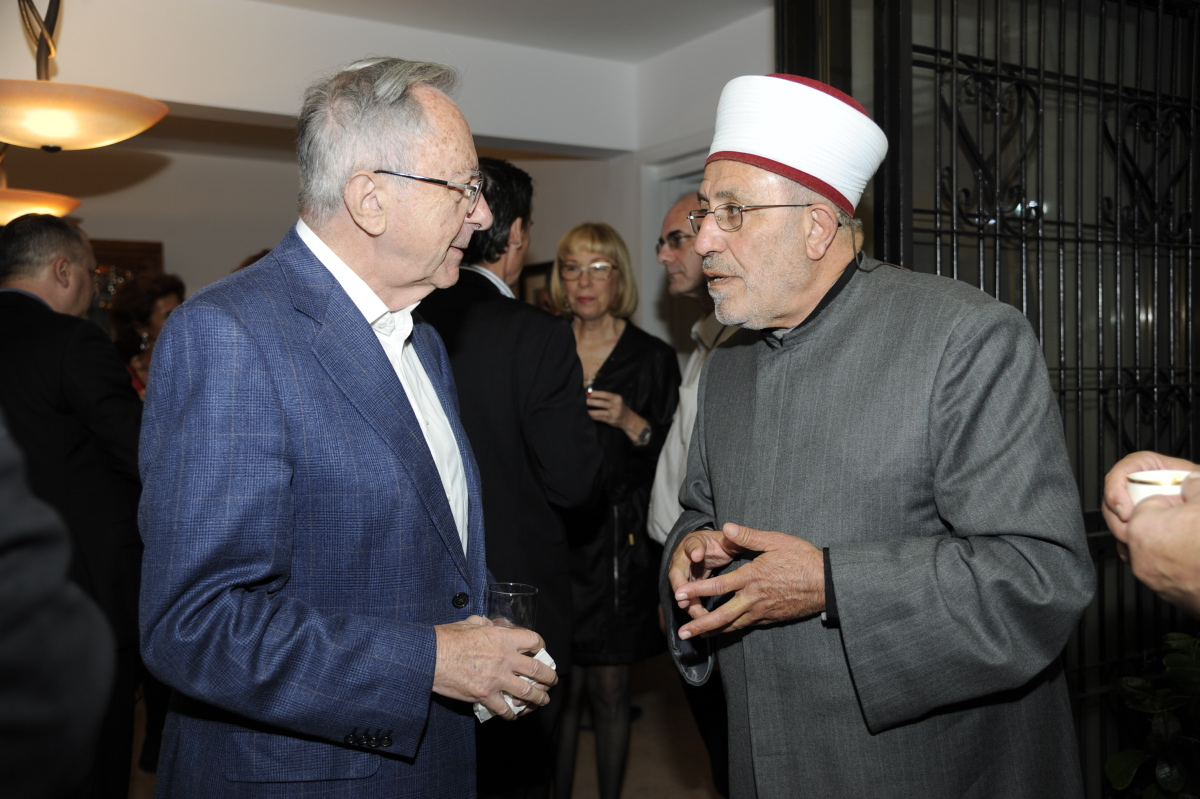
Interfaith Thanksgiving dinner

- Cultural fusion theory
  - Cultural fusion theory explains how immigrants can acculturate into the dominant culture they move to. They maintain important aspects of their culture while adopting aspects of the dominant culture. This creates an intercultural identity within an individual, their native identity as well as their new host culture identity. According to Eric Mark Kramer, the first proponent of cultural fusion theory, this theory distinguishes itself from more dominant frameworks, such as cultural adaptation, by focusing on the combination of many cultures not of adapting from one culture to a dominant one.

=== Identity negotiation and management therioes ===
Identity negotiation and identity management theories are concerned with how individuals negotiate, create, sustain, and change a cultural identity in intercultural situations. Instead of seeing identity as static, scholars such as Ronald L. Jackson II (1999) see cultural identity as socially constructed and negotiated through communication. Drawing from his empirical research on African American and European American men and how they define their identity, Jackson shows that people negotiate and manage both how they see themselves and how others in society expect them to act within the distribution of power and historical context. Other theories such as identity management theory, identity negotiation theory, cultural identity theory, and the double swing model also analyze how communicators reconcile with and validate others' personal and group identities.

=== Communication networks ===
- Networks and outgroup communication competence
- Intracultural versus intercultural networks
- Networks and acculturation

=== Acculturation and adjustment ===
Acculturation can be defined as the process of an individual or individuals exchanging or adopting certain culture values and practices that the dominant culture of their location possesses. Acculturation differs from assimilation because the people who are adopting new culture habits are still processing some of their original own culture habits. Young Yun Kim has identified three personality traits that could affect someone's cultural adaptation. These personality traits include openness, strength, and positive. With these personality traits, individuals will be more successful in acculturating than individuals who do not possess these traits. Kim proposes an alternative to acculturation is complete assimilation.

- Communication acculturation
  - This theory attempts to portray "cross-cultural adaptation as a collaborative effort in which a stranger and the receiving environment are engaged in a joint effort."
- Anxiety/uncertainty management
  - When strangers communicate with hosts, they experience uncertainty and anxiety. Strangers need to manage their uncertainty as well as their anxiety in order to be able to communicate effectively with hosts and then to try to develop accurate predictions and explanations for hosts' behaviors.
- Assimilation, deviance, and alienation states
  - Assimilation and adaptation are not permanent outcomes of the adaptation process; rather, they are temporary outcomes of the communication process between hosts and immigrants. "Alienation or assimilation, therefore, of a group or an individual, is an outcome of the relationship between deviant behavior and neglectful communication."
- Assimilation
  - Assimilation is the process of absorbing the traits of the dominant culture to the point where the group that was assimilated becomes indistinguishable from the host culture. Assimilation can be either forced or done voluntarily depending on situations and conditions. Regardless of the situation or the condition, it is very rare to see a minority group replace and or even forget their previous cultural practices.
- Alienation
  - Alienation frequently refers to someone who is ostracized or withdrawn from other people with whom they would ordinarily be expected to associate with. Hajda, a representative theorist and researcher of social alienation says, "alienation is an individuals feeling of uneasiness or discomfort which reflects his exclusion or self-exclusion from social and cultural participation."

=== Three perspectives on intercultural communication ===
A study on cultural and intercultural communication came up with three perspectives, which are the indigenous approach, cultural approach, and cross-cultural approach.

- Indigenous approach: trying to understand the meaning of different cultures. The process of passing preserved indigenous knowledge and how that is interpreted.
- Cultural approach: similar to the indigenous approach; however, the cultural approach also focuses on the sociocultural context of an individual.
- Cross cultural approaches: focuses on two or more cultures to perceive cross-cultural validity and generalizability.

=== Other theories ===
- Meaning of meanings theory – "A misunderstanding takes place when people assume a word has a direct connection with its referent. A common past reduces misunderstanding. Definition, metaphor, feedforward, and Basic English are partial linguistic remedies for a lack of shared experience."
- Face negotiation theory – "Members of collectivistic, high-context cultures have concerns for mutual face and inclusion that lead them to manage conflict with another person by avoiding, obliging, or compromising. Because of concerns for self-face and autonomy, people from individualistic, low-context cultures manage conflict by dominating or through problem solving".
- Standpoint theory – An individual's experiences, knowledge, and communication behaviors are shaped in large part by the social groups to which they belong. Individuals sometimes view things similarly, but other times have very different views in which they see the world. The ways in which they view the world are shaped by the experiences they have and through the social group they identify themselves to be a part of. "Feminist standpoint theory claims that the social groups to which we belong shape what we know and how we communicate.(Wood, 2005) The theory is derived from the Marxist position that economically oppressed classes can access knowledge unavailable to the socially privileged and can generate distinctive accounts, particularly knowledge about social relations."
- Stranger theory – At least one of the persons in an intercultural encounter is a stranger. Strangers are a 'hyperaware' of cultural differences and tend to overestimate the effect of cultural identity on the behavior of people in an alien society, while blurring individual distinctions.
- Feminist genre theory – Evaluates communication by identifying feminist speakers and reframing their speaking qualities as models for women's liberation.
- Genderlect theory – "Male-female conversation is cross-cultural communication. Masculine and feminine styles of discourse are best viewed as two distinct cultural dialects rather than as inferior or superior ways of speaking. Men's report talk focuses on status and independence. Women's support talk seeks human connection."
- Cultural critical studies theory – The theory states that the mass media impose the dominant ideology on the rest of society, and the connotations of words and images are fragments of ideology that perform an unwitting service for the ruling elite.
- Marxism – Aims to explain class struggle and the basis of social relations through economics.

== Authentic intercultural communication ==
Authentic intercultural communication is possible. A theory that was found in 1984 and revisited on 1987 explains the importance of truth and intention of getting an understanding. Furthermore, if strategic intent is hidden, there can't be any authentic intercultural communication.

In intercultural communication, there could be miscommunication, and the term is called "misfire." Later on, a theory was founded that has three layers of intercultural communication. The first level is effective communication, second-level miscommunication, and third-level systemically distorted communication. It is difficult to go to the first level due to the speaker's position and the structure.

At a practical level, the success of intercultural communication will not be modeled around awareness of and sensitivity to the essentially different behaviors and values of 'the other culture', but around the employment of the ability to read culture which derives from underlying universal cultural processes.

== History of assimilation ==
Forced assimilation was very common in the European colonial empires in the 18th, 19th, and 20th centuries. Colonial policies regarding religion conversion, the removal of children, the division of community property, and the shifting of gender roles primarily impacted North and South America, Australia, Africa, and Asia.

Voluntary assimilation has also been a part of history dating back to the Spanish Inquisition of the late 14th and 15th centuries, when many Muslims and Jews voluntarily converted to Roman Catholicism as a response to religious prosecution while secretly continuing their original practices. Another example is when the Europeans moved to the United States.

== Intercultural competence ==
Intercultural communication is competent when it accomplishes the objectives in a manner that is appropriate to the context and relationship. Intercultural communication thus needs to bridge the dichotomy between appropriateness and effectiveness: Proper means of intercultural communication leads to a 15% decrease in miscommunication.

- Appropriateness: Valued rules, norms, and expectations of the relationship are not violated significantly.
- Effectiveness: Valued goals or rewards (relative to costs and alternatives) are accomplished.

Competent communication is an interaction that is seen as effective in achieving certain rewarding objectives in a way that is also related to the context in which the situation occurs. In other words, it is a conversation with an achievable goal that is used at an appropriate time/location.

Expanding cultural awareness amongst peers will improve cultural empathy, fluency, and awareness amongst ethnic groups that are present. One practice of Competent communication allows both the speaker and listener from different cultural backgrounds to engage in a process known as Verbal Exchange. Verbal Exchange is the practice of Intercultural Communication, where speakers and listeners from different cultural backgrounds exhibit shared verbal ideas. There is another helpful way to limit language barriers between the listener and speaker. For Instance, asking the intercultural speaker for clarification of what was said in a discussion, accommodating speech rate, and observing the speaker's facial expressions will meet the needs/wants of the intercultural speaker.

Intercultural Communication Competence (ICC) is considered by communication scholars to be a fundamental aspect in communicating adequately amongst peers of culturally diverse backgrounds. Intercultural Communication Competence (ICC) practices assertiveness and perception. Assertiveness allows peers to express their needs. Perception allows peers to study cultural customs and values. The absence of the following practices results in dialect barriers between peers. Dialect barriers are communication gaps that lead to misunderstandings between conversations. For instance, the absence of appreciating cultures and linguistic fluency, Workplaces and Academic Settings utilize Intercultural Communication Competence (ICC) for the purpose of integrating skills such as analytical reasoning, cultural awareness, and constructive work ethics.

Components

Intercultural communication can be linked with identity, which means the competent communicator is the person who can affirm others' avowed identities. As well as goal attainment is also a focus within intercultural competence and it involves the communicator to convey a sense of communication appropriateness and effectiveness in diverse cultural contexts.

Ethnocentrism plays a role in intercultural communication. The capacity to avoid ethnocentrism is the foundation of intercultural communication competence. Ethnocentrism is the inclination to view one's own group as natural and correct, and all others as aberrant.

People must be aware that to engage and fix intercultural communication there is no easy solution and there is not only one way to do so. Listed below are some of the components of intercultural competence.

- Context: A judgment that a person is competent is made in both a relational and situational context. This means that competence is not defined as a single attribute, meaning someone could be very strong in one section and only moderately good in another. Situationally speaking competence can be defined differently for different cultures. For example, eye contact shows competence in western cultures whereas, Asian cultures find too much eye contact disrespectful.
- Appropriateness: This means that one's behaviors are acceptable and proper for the expectations of any given culture.
- Effectiveness: The behaviors that lead to the desired outcome being achieved.
- Motivations: This has to do with emotional associations as they communicate interculturally. Feelings which are one's reactions to thoughts and experiences have to do with motivation. Intentions are thoughts that guide one's choices, it is a goal or plan that directs one's behavior. These two things play a part in motivation.

=== Basic tools for improvement ===
The following are ways to improve communication competence:

- Display of interest: Showing respect and positive regard for the other person.
- Orientation to knowledge: Terms people use to explain themselves and their perception of the world.
- Empathy: Behaving in ways that shows one understands the point of view of others
- Task role behavior: Initiate ideas that encourage problem solving activities.
- Relational role behavior: Interpersonal harmony and mediation.
- Tolerance for unknown and ambiguity: The ability to react to new situations with little discomfort.
- Interaction posture: Responding to others in descriptive, non-judgmental ways.
- Patience
- Active listening
- Clarity

=== Important factors ===
- Proficiency in the host culture language: understanding the grammar and vocabulary.
- Understanding language pragmatics: how to use politeness strategies in making requests and how to avoid giving out too much information.
- Being sensitive and aware to nonverbal communication patterns in other cultures.
- Being aware of gestures that may be offensive or mean something different in a host culture rather than one's own culture.
- Understanding a culture's proximity in physical space and paralinguistic sounds to convey their intended meaning.
- Mutual understanding with the aim of promoting a future of appreciation, robustness and diversity.

=== Traits ===
- Flexibility.
- Tolerating high levels of uncertainty.
- Self-reflection.
- Open-mindedness.
- Sensitivity.
- Adaptability.
- "Thinking outside the box" and lateral thinking

Effective communication depends on the informal understandings among the parties involved that are based on the trust developed between them. When trust exists, there is implicit understanding within communication, cultural differences may be overlooked, and problems can be dealt with more easily. The meaning of trust and how it is developed and communicated varies across societies. Similarly, some cultures have a greater propensity to be trusting than others.

The problems in intercultural communication usually come from problems in message transmission and in reception. In communication between people of the same culture, the person who receives the message interprets it based on values, beliefs, and expectations for behavior similar to those of the person who sent the message. When this happens, the way the message is interpreted by the receiver is likely to be fairly similar to what the speaker intended. However, when the receiver of the message is a person from a different culture, the receiver uses information from his or her culture to interpret the message. The message that the receiver interprets may be very different from what the speaker intended.

== Areas of interest ==
=== Cross-cultural business strategies ===
Cross-cultural business communication is helpful in building cultural intelligence through coaching and training in cross-cultural communication management and facilitation, cross-cultural negotiation, multicultural conflict resolution, customer service, business and organizational communication. Cross-cultural understanding begins with those responsible for the project and reaches those delivering the service or content. The ability to communicate, negotiate and effectively work with people from other cultures can be important to international business.

==== Management ====
Important points to consider:

- Develop cultural sensitivity.
- Anticipate the meaning the receiver will get.
- Careful encoding.
- Use words, pictures, and gestures.
- Avoid slang, idioms, regional sayings.
- Selective transmission.
- Build relationships, face-to-face if possible.
- Careful decoding of feedback.
- Get feedback from multiple parties.
- Improve listening and observation skills.
- Follow-up actions.

==== Facilitation ====
There is a connection between a person's personality traits and the ability to adapt to the host-country's environment—including the ability to communicate within that environment.

Two key personality traits are openness and resilience. Openness includes traits such as tolerance for ambiguity, extroversion and introversion, and open-mindedness. Resilience, on the other hand, includes having an internal locus of control, persistence, tolerance for ambiguity, and resourcefulness.

These factors, combined with the person's cultural and racial identity and level of liberalism, comprise that person's potential for adaptation.

==== Miscommunication in a Business Setting ====
In a business environment, Intercultural Communication and Globalization cultivates workers to communicate with co-workers of diverse cultural backgrounds, which reduce disputes and misinterpretations in verbal exchanges. Nonetheless, miscommunication is still present amongst workers who have differing values and customs. For instance, some workers report feeling obstructive emotions towards other co-workers because they feel misunderstood. The reason why one gets negative feelings is because of miscommunication.

One study done entails the communication between non-native English speaking and native English speaking people in the United States. The study showed that, in a business environment, non-native English speakers and native English speakers had similar experiences in the workplace. Although native English speakers tried to breakdown the miscommunication, non-native English speakers were offended by the terms they used.

=== Cultural Perceptions ===
There are common conceptualizations of attributes that define collectivistic and individualistic cultures. Operationalizing the perceptions of cultural identities works under the guise that cultures are static and homogeneous, when in fact cultures within nations are multi-ethnic and individuals show high variation in how cultural differences are internalized and expressed.

Manuela Guilherme, a teacher of foreign languages and cultures at secondary schools and university-level courses in Portugal and Great Britain, recognizes a need for a postmodern, decentered critique of Western societies from the point of view of the other in which no one should be regarded as culturally inferior or colonizable. Holliday states their opposition to this approach by discussing their distaste in Guilherme's and Byram's, a Professor of Education at Durham University, England, orientations towards a clear line between "our culture" and "their culture."

=== Culture-Based Conflict Situation Models ===
The goal of the original CBSCM proposed by Ting-Toomey and Oetzel (2001) was to use the model as a tentative map to organize and explain the various research concepts in the growing intercultural conflict field. It was based on the culture-based situational model in 2001 and Toomey and Oetzel envisioned that researchers and practitioners could collaborate in an integrative manner and locate concepts and linkage of ideas between the factors and test them in a systematic manner when creating the original CBSCM.

The original CBSCM consists of four components: (1) primary orientation factors (e.g., value patterns and personal attributes), (2) situational and relational boundary features (e.g., in-group-out-group boundary, interpersonal relationship boundary, and conflict goals' assessment), (3) conflict communication process factors (e.g., conflict styles and facework behaviors), and (4) conflict competence features (e.g., appropriates and effectiveness, productivity and satisfaction).

The integration of the newly revised socioecological framework added by Ting-Toomey and Oetzel (2013) and the original CBSCM results in the revised model. The model still depicts two parties (e.g., people) in conflict with one another and illustrates how the conflict process unfolds. The model is meant to describe the process as continuous and flowing rather than starting at a particular point.

The model is meant to describe the process as continuous and flowing rather than starting at a particular point. It is possible to consider additional conflict parties or entities in the conflict process, yet we are constrained in drawing a model on a single page. The primary orientation factors now include multilevel factors at the macro-, exo-, meso-, and microlevels. The situational appraisals also include multilevel factors at each of these levels.

=== Globalization ===
Globalization plays a central role in theorizing for mass communication, media, and cultural communication studies. Intercultural communication scholars emphasize that globalization emerged from the increasing diversity of cultures throughout the world and thrives with the removal of cultural barriers. The notion of nationality, or the construction of national space, is understood to emerge dialectically through communication and globalization.

The Intercultural Praxis Model by Kathryn Sorrells, Ph.D. Aims to show people how to navigate through the complexities of cultural differences along with power differences. More precisely it aims to help people understand who they are as an individual, and how one can better communicate with others that may be different from oneself. In order to continue living in a globalized society one may use this Praxis model to understand cultural differences (based on race, ethnicity, gender, class, sexual orientation, religion, nationality, etc.) within the institutional and historical systems of power. Intercultural Communication Praxis Model requires one to respond to someone who comes from a different culture, in the most open way they can. The media are influential in what someone might think of other cultures and what some think about their own selves. However it is important, we educate ourselves, and learn how to communicate with others through Sorrells' Praxis Model.

Sorrells' process is made up of six points of entry in navigating intercultural spaces, including inquiry, framing, positioning, dialogue, reflection, and action. Inquiry, as the first step of the Intercultural Praxis Model, is an overall interest in learning about and understanding individuals with different cultural backgrounds and world-views, while challenging one's own perceptions. Framing, then, is the awareness of "local and global contexts that shape intercultural interactions;" thus, the ability to shift between the micro, meso, and macro frames. Positioning is the consideration of one's place in the world compared to others, and how this position might influence both world-views and certain privileges. Dialogue is the turning point of the process during which further understanding of differences and possible tensions develops through experience and engagement with cultures outside of one's own. Next, reflection allows for one to learn through introspection the values of those differences, as well as enables action within the world "in meaningful, effective, and responsible ways." This finally leads to action, which aims to create a more conscious world by working toward social justice and peace among different cultures. As Sorrells argues, "In the context of globalization, [intercultural praxis] … offers us a process of critical, reflective thinking and acting that enables us to navigate … intercultural spaces we inhabit interpersonally, communally, and globally."

== Interdisciplinary orientation ==
Cross-cultural communication endeavors to bring together such relatively unrelated areas as cultural anthropology and established areas of communication. Its core is to establish and understand how people from different cultures communicate with each other. Its charge is to also produce some guidelines with which people from different cultures can better communicate with each other.

Cross-cultural communication, as with many scholarly fields, is a combination of many other fields. These fields include anthropology, cultural studies, psychology and communication. The field has also moved both toward the treatment of interethnic relations, and toward the study of communication strategies used by co-cultural populations, i.e., communication strategies used to deal with majority or mainstream populations.

The study of languages other than one's own can not only serve to help one understand what we humans have in common, but also to gain more knowledge on the ways different languages organize and communicate information. Such understanding has deep implications with respect to developing an awareness of social relationships. Understanding social relationships and the way other cultures work is the groundwork of successful globalization business affairs.

Language socialization can be broadly defined as "an investigation of how language both presupposes and creates anew, social relations in cultural context". It is imperative that the speaker understands the grammar of a language, as well as how elements of language are socially situated in order to reach communicative competence. Human experience is culturally relevant, so elements of language are also culturally relevant. One must carefully consider semiotics and the evaluation of sign systems to compare cross-cultural norms of communication. There are several potential problems that come with language socialization, however. Sometimes people can overgeneralize or label cultures with stereotypical and subjective characterizations. Another primary concern with documenting alternative cultural norms revolves around the fact that no social actor uses language in ways that perfectly match normative characterizations. A methodology for investigating how an individual uses language and other semiotic activity to create and use new models of conduct and how this varies from the cultural norm should be incorporated into the study of language socialization.

== Verbal communication ==
Verbal intercultural communication techniques improve speakers' or listeners' capacity for speech production or comprehension. Depending on the communication situation, the plans could either be formal or informal. Verbal communication consists of messages being sent and received continuously with the speaker and the listener, it is focused on the way messages are portrayed. Verbal communication is based on language and use of expression, the tone in which the sender of the message relays the communication can determine how the message is received and in what context.

Factors that affect verbal communication:

- Tone of voice
- Use of descriptive words
- Emphasis on certain phrases
- Volume of voice
- Practice active listening

The way a message is received is dependent on these factors as they give a greater interpretation for the receiver as to what is meant by the message. By emphasizing a certain phrase with the tone of voice, this indicates that it is important and should be focused more on.

Along with these attributes, verbal communication is also accompanied with non-verbal cues. These cues make the message clearer and give the listener an indication of what way the information should be received.

Example of non-verbal cues

- Facial expressions
- Hand gestures
- Use of objects
- Body movement

In terms of intercultural communication there are language barriers which are effected by verbal forms of communication. In this instance there is opportunity for miscommunication between two or more parties. Other barriers that contribute to miscommunication would be the type of words chosen in conversation. Due to different cultures there are different meaning in vocabulary chosen, this allows for a message between the sender and receiver to be misconstrued.

== Nonverbal communication ==
Nonverbal communication refers to gestures, facial expressions, tone of voice, eye contact (or lack thereof), body language, posture, and other ways people can communicate without using language. Minor variations in body language, speech rhythms, and punctuality often cause differing interpretations of the situation among cross-cultural parties. Kinesic behavior is communication through body movement—e.g., posture, gestures, facial expressions and eye contact. The meaning of such behavior varies across countries. Clothing and the way people dress is used as a form of nonverbal communication.

Object language or material culture refers to how people communicate through material artifacts—e.g., architecture, office design and furniture, clothing, cars, cosmetics, and time. In monochronic cultures, time is experienced linearly and as something to be spent, saved, made up, or wasted. Time orders life, and people tend to concentrate on one thing at a time. In polychronic cultures, people tolerate many things happening simultaneously and emphasize involvement with people. In these cultures, people may be highly distractible, focus on several things at once, and change plans often.

Occulesics are a form of kinesics that includes eye contact and the use of the eyes to convey messages. Proxemics concern the influence of proximity and space on communication (e.g., in terms of personal space and in terms of office layout). For example, space communicates power in the US and Germany.

Paralanguage refers to how something is said, rather than the content of what is said—e.g., rate of speech, tone and inflection of voice, other noises, laughing, yawning, and silence.

Nonverbal communication has been shown to account for between 65% and 93% of interpreted communication. Minor variations in body language, speech rhythms, and punctuality often cause mistrust and misperception of the situation among cross-cultural parties. This is where nonverbal communication can cause problems with intercultural communication. Misunderstandings with nonverbal communication can lead to miscommunication and insults with cultural differences. For example, a handshake in one culture may be recognized as appropriate, whereas another culture may recognize it as rude or inappropriate.

== See also ==
- Adaptive behavior
- Adaptive behaviors
- Clyde Kluckhohn
- Cross-cultural communication
- Cultural competence
- Cultural diversity
- Cultural intelligence
- Cultural schema theory
- Cultural sensitivity
- Culture shock
- Framing (social sciences)
- Human communication
- Intercultural competence
- Intercultural dialogue
- Intercultural simulation
- Intergroup dialogue
- Lacuna model
- Multilingualism
- Richard D. Lewis
- Value (personal and cultural)
