= Jantje Visscher =

American artist

Jantje Visscher is an American mixed-media artist and teacher. Her work involves painting, printmaking, photography, and sculpture. Visscher uses geometry and mathematics to explore the dynamics of perception and optical effects through the use of nontraditional mixed media.

She lives and works in Minneapolis, Minnesota, participated in Women's Art Resources of Minnesota Mentor Program and the Traffic Zone Center for Visual Art. Visscher is best known for hard-edge abstraction and minimalism within her scientific approach and exploration of perception and mathematics.

== Early life and education ==
Jantje Visscher graduated with a Bachelor of Arts in Political Science from Antioch College in Yellow Springs, Ohio. She later earned her M.F.A in Fine Arts, Painting, and Printmaking from the University of California Berkeley in 1962. After graduate school, Visscher returned to Minnesota to take care of her family. In 1973, she connected to other female artists in Minnesota and helped found WARM.

== Groups and Collectives ==
=== WARM (Women's Art Resource of Minnesota) ===
Visscher is one of the founding members of WARM, a feminist artist collective based in Minnesota. The collective became an important aspect of Visscher's practice and career She now serves as a mentor in WARM's Mentor Program, which pairs emerging artists with professional artists. Her philosophy as a mentor includes the constant revision of goals and refocusing one's daily life and artistic practices. She strives to help protegees develop basic career skills like marketing, drawing, and Photoshop, to help them become successful practicing artists. As a mentor, Visscher encourages philosophical discussion, the refinement of technical skills, and a regular schedule for creating art. Visscher mentored Maryellen Murphy from 2013 to 2014 as a part of the program, as well as Kate Vinson from 2015 to 2016, participating in the final capstone exhibitions associated with the program. She exhibited her piece, Capital in the final exhibition Landing and Launching in 2016, and exhibited Making Your Wings in the 2014 final exhibition Beyond the Surface.

=== Traffic Zone Center for Visual Art ===
Visscher is also one of the founding members of Traffic Zone Center for Visual Arts, which provides studio spaces for artists. Visscher has also exhibited her work through the Center, including in the 22nd Annual Spring Open Studio and a solo show, Motion, both in 2017. Motion featured collaged prints that display her fascination with the “constant motion of everything in the universe”.

== Artistic Style ==
Visscher uses various techniques and processes to achieve nonobjective representations. Her style emerged by using geometric principles to create intuitive expression through repetition, limited color palettes, and grids. Visscher introduces a shifting relationship between figure and ground, as her experimental constructions invite various perceptions and illusions from viewers. Her work is reminiscent of the natural sciences and architecture, and she often uses radiating lines to intersect grids, mimicking moire patterns to create dramatic weaving, swirling, and swelling forms.

Her work Beautiful Lie Landscapes features diptych photographs of natural landscapes and waves that create an optical illusion when disoriented. Visscher “never gave the subject a thought until she glanced at a photo of a wave a couple of years ago and realized it was upside down but looked right”, beginning her curiosity with orientation and perception. In a solo show titled Drawings in Light, Visscher's work explored “the idea of using a force of nature and light energy, as a drawing material”.

== Work ==
=== Selected exhibitions ===
- 2017: Motion, Traffic Zone Center for Visual Art, Minneapolis, Minnesota.
- 2016: Launching and Landing, WARM Mentor-Protegee exhibition, Minneapolis, Minnesota.
- 2007: Drawings In Light, Minnesota Artists Exhibition Program, Minneapolis Institute of Arts, Minneapolis, Minnesota.
- 2006: 12 Artists of the Women’s Art Registry of Minnesota, Weisman Art Museum, Minneapolis, Minnesota.
- 2005: Abstract Art in MN, Minnesota Museum of American Art, St. Paul, Minnesota.
- 2004: Faculty Exhibit, Women’s Art Institute, Minneapolis College of Art & Design, Minneapolis, Minnesota.
- 2003: One by One, Traffic Zone Center for Visual Art, Minneapolis, Minnesota.
- 2002: Group exhibition, Bush Foundation, St. Paul, Minnesota.
- 2001: Recent Photographs: The Beginning is Also the End, Traffic Zone Center for Visual Art, Minneapolis, Minnesota.
- 2000: Emerging Perceptions, College of St. Catherine, St. Paul, Minnesota.

=== Public displays ===
- Walker Art Center, Minneapolis
- First Banks, Minneapolis
- Minneapolis Corporate Institute of Arts; Weisman Museum, Minneapolis
- Minnesota Museum of American Art, St. Paul
- College of St. Catherine, St. Paul
- KTCA, St. Paul
- University of Oklahoma Museum of Art, Norman, Oklahoma
- President’s House, Duke University, Durham, North Carolina
- Northern States Power, Minneapolis
- Minneapolis Star Tribune
- Grand Metropolitan, Minneapolis
- University of Minnesota Hospitals, Minneapolis
- Morgan Whitney, Minneapolis
- The Marsh Center, Minnetonka
- Minnesota Historical Society, St. Paul
- College of St. Thomas, St. Paul
- Chamber of Commerce, St. Paul
- College of St. Benedict, St. Joseph, Minnesota
- Stylmark, Fridley, Minnesota

=== Commissioned work ===
- St. Paul, Entrances for the St. Paul Civic Center 1995
- Willmar Technical College, MN for Arts, 1993
- University of Wisconsin, River Falls, WI for Arts 1991
- Willmar Community College, MN for Arts 1991
- Mural for State of Minnesota, Centennial Building, 18 feet, MN forArts 1990
- The state of Minnesota, Department of Finance, MN for Arts 1990
- State of Minnesota, Centennial Building, 3rd floor, MN for Arts 1990

=== Awards and nominations ===
- St. Paul, Civic Center Competition, 1995
- Honors NEA Visual Arts Fellowship 1989
- Minnesota State Arts Board Career Opportunity Grant 1989
- ArtsMidwest/NEA Fellowship 1988
- Bush Foundation Fellowship 1984
- Minnesota State Arts Board Project Grant 1984
- WARM Livingston Griggs Mentor Grants 1981,1986,1991,1997
