= Jin Meyerson =

American painter

Nicole (2005, oil and acrylic, 208 x 127 cm) by Jin Meyerson

Jin Meyerson (born 1972 in Incheon, South Korea) is an American artist previously based in Brooklyn, New York, later dividing his time between Paris and Seoul.

== Early life and education ==
Born in Incheon, South Korea, and given up for adoption, Jin Meyerson grew up in rural Minnesota, adopted into a Jewish-Swedish family, before pursuing his education in fine arts. He received his BFA from Minneapolis College of Art and Design in 1995, and his MFA from Pennsylvania Academy of Fine Arts in 1997.

== Career ==
Meyerson has shown work internationally in several exhibitions and galleries including High Cholesterol Moment at Zach Feuer Gallery in New York, The Triumph of Painting at the Saatchi Gallery in London and at Galerie Emmanuel Perrotin in Paris. With a disposition for large scale painting of high detail, the work draws varied responses from critics, claiming to recognize a wide range of influences, and identifying Meyerson's underlying ambition "to hold his own with the big guns". The work has been termed "hybrid fiction, born from photojournalistic fact".

Meyerson is represented by Emmanuel Perrotin in Paris. His exhibition Progress is No Longer a Guarantee opened at Galerie Michael Janssen in September 2007. with the catalogue Jin Meyerson - 2001-2007 also published in 2007 by Snoeck Verlag. Later solo exhibitions include There is no way out. But always a way through in 2008 at Galerie Nordine Zidoun in Luxembourg, Forecast in 2009 at the Arario Gallery in Seoul, and Carpal Fatigue in 2010 at the Galerie Emmanuel Perrotin. Meyerson's work has been included in a variety of group exhibitions in 2010–2011 taking place in New York, Paris, Tokyo and Singapore. His work is held in public and private collections around the world, among them the Solomon R Guggenheim Museum, New York; Saatch Gallery, London; and Yuz Foundation, Jakarta.

== Interpretation ==
Jin Meyerson's paintings are schizophrenic semi-abstractions based on throwaway images from magazines and other random pieces of visual culture. Although the use of media imagery is common ground for many contemporary painters, Meyerson's take on the topic is more manic than most; while artists such as Ulrich Lamsfuss, Johannes Kahrs and Gerhard Richter are more concerned with the faithful – almost obsessive – copy, Meyerson's takes his source material as a sketch which he can distort, tear apart, rearrange and fill with psychedelic colour. Meyerson does not completely destroy or obscure the images, but by the end of his more-or-less unplanned interventions the painting's origin is severely disguised. Most of Mayerson's work displays his fascination with moving images, but for him a moment of speed or activity caught on film is not enough; the addition of swirling bands of striking colour add to the sense of motion to create something that functions beyond the limits of painting and photography, making the viewer ‘feel’ the energy of the image and invoke the spectacle of real life action when the moment itself is long over.
