= Lamsfuß =

Lamsfuß may refer to:

== People ==
- Mark Lamsfuß (born 1994), German badminton player
- Ulrich Lamsfuß (1971), German artist

== Places ==
- Lamsfuß (de), village in Wipperfürth, North Rhine-Westphalia, Germany
