= MJS =

MJS can refer to:

- Minneapolis Japanese School
- Milwaukee Journal Sentinel
- Young Socialist Movement (French: Mouvement des Jeunes Socialistes), France
- Movement of Young Socialists, Belgium
- Michael Joseph Savage, Prime minister of New Zealand
- .mjs, the recommended file extension for JavaScript module files
- mjs, the ISO 639-3 code for the Miship language
- Mariner Jupiter-Saturn, acronym for the cancelled NASA probe
