= Nankivil =

Nankivil is a surname. Notable people with the surname include:

- Keaton Nankivil (born 1989), American basketball player
- Lisa Nankivil (born 1958), American artist
