= Patrick Jennings (disambiguation) =

Patrick Jennings (1831–1897) was an Irish-Australian politician and Premier of New South Wales.

Patrick or Pat Jennings may also refer to:

- Patrick Jennings (writer) (born 1962), American author of children's books
- Pat Jennings (born 1945), Northern Irish football goalkeeper
- Pat Jennings Jr. (born 1979), Northern Irish football goalkeeper
- W. Pat Jennings (1919–1994), American politician from Virginia's 9th congressional district

== See also ==
- Patrick Jennings Brady (born 1967), American artist
