= Vesna Kittelson =

Croatian American painter

Vesna Krezich Kittelson is a Croatian American painter. Kittelson was a member of the Women's Art Registry of Minnesota (WARM). She taught at the Minneapolis College of Art and Design.

Kittelson was born 1947 in Trebinje, Bosnia and Herzegovina and grew up in the ancient city of Split, Croatia, a coastal city known for its ancient Roman ruins.

Kittelson received her B.A. in maritime law from the University of Split in 1970 where she received a grant to study English at Newnham College in Cambridge, England. While in Cambridge she was inspired to study art. She moved to the United States and attended the University of Minnesota where she earned a B.A. in studio arts in 1974 and an M.A. in design in 1978.

In 2009 Kittelson returned to Cambridge, England where she became interested in Emma Wedgwood, who was married to Charles Darwin. Kittelson created four volumes titled Mrs. Darwin's Garden. The accordion-fold books are a collection of paintings, collage, and text that imagine Darwin's travels and how they might have been used for Emma's garden. Three of the books were exhibited in 2014 at Form + Content Gallery in Minneapolis. All four books appeared in Dear Darwin, a 2017 exhibition exploring themes of natural science, evolution and Charles Darwin at the Weisman Museum of Art in Minneapolis.

Kittelson's Young Americans was included in the Weisman Art Museum's Tenuous, Though Real exhibition.

She received the Bush Artists Fellowship for Painting.

In 2024 Kittelson won the Minnesota Book Artist Award for her artist's book "Letters to Amerika".

== Museum Collections ==
Brooklyn Museum Art Library, Brooklyn, New York

Bush Foundation Collection, St. Paul, Minnesota

Cafesjian Center for the Arts, Yerevan, Armenia

Dibner Library of the History of Science and Technology, Smithsonian Libraries, Washington, D.C.

Getty Research Institute, Los Angeles, California

Minnesota Center for Book Arts, Minneapolis, Minnesota

Minnesota History Center, St. Paul, Minnesota

Minnesota Museum of American Art, St. Paul, Minnesota

Tate Library, Tate Britain, London, England

Walker Art Center Library, Minneapolis, Minnesota

Weisman Art Museum, Minneapolis, Minnesota

Yale University Art Library, New Haven, Connecticut
