= Hazel Belvo =

American painter

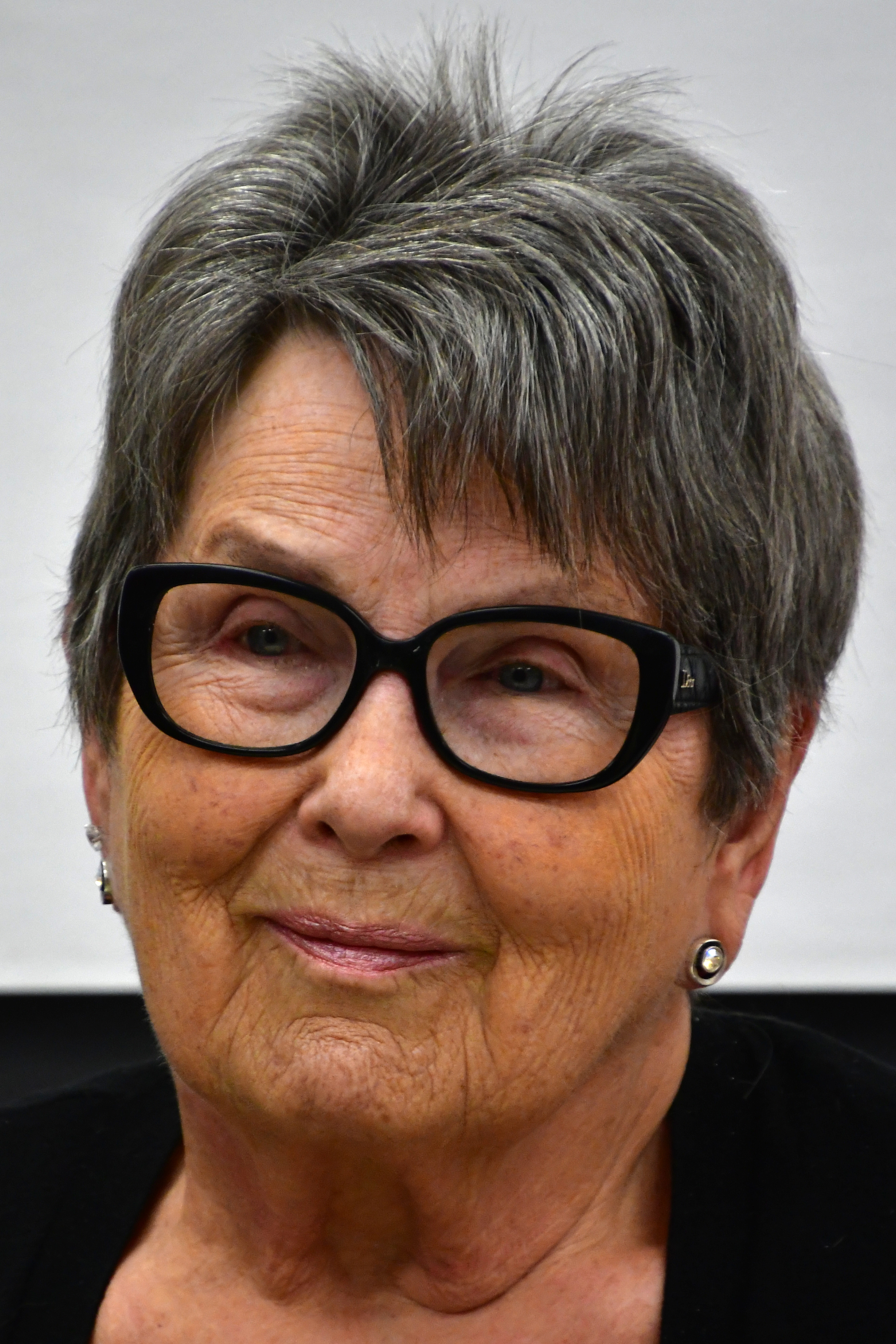
- Born: December 18, 1934 (age 91); Centerville, Ohio
- Education: Dayton Art Institute
- Movement: Feminist art movement Women's Art Registry of Minnesota

Hazel Belvo (born December 18, 1934) is an American painter, educator and women's art advocate.

Belvo was born in 1934 and grew up on a farm in Centerville, Ohio. She attended Dayton Art Institute. She taught art at St. Paul Academy. She spent her summers in Grand Portage, Minnesota and was an artist-in-residence at the Grand Marais Art Colony, and taught there for many years. She was a co-founder of the Women's Art Registry of Minnesota (WARM). She became Chair of Fine Arts at the Minneapolis College of Art and Design in 1989. She retired as Professor Emeritus at Minneapolis College of Art and Design in 1998.

Belvo's art engages spirituality, myth, and the feminine, with the study of nature as a prominent theme. Her exhibition Spirit Tree at the Bockley Gallery featured paintings of the Little Cedar Spirit Tree (Manidoo-giizhikens). Her series Transfusion Quartet was based on her experiences waiting for someone having a blood transfusion and the images took on a "metaphysical significance under psychological and physical reality seemed inextricably connected."

Belvo was one of twelve artists profiled in Joanna Inglot's 2007 book WARM: A Feminist Art Collective in Minnesota.

Belvo's work is included in private and public collections including the Minneapolis Institute of Art, Minnesota Museum of American Art, Walker Art Center, Frederick R. Weisman Art Museum, Tweed Museum of Art, Bezalel Museum, Dewitt-Wallace Foundation and General Mills.

== Personal life ==
Belvo was married and had two sons before she met Anishinaabe artist George Morrison at Ohio's Dayton Art Institute. They wed in 1960 and had a son, Briand Mesaba, in 1961. They lived in a renovated church in Saint Paul and in the mid-1970s purchased land on Lake Superior near Grand Portage. They named it "Red Rock" and it served as both home and studio for the artists. Belvo divorced Morrison in 1991 and the two remained friends. Morrison died in 2000. Belvo's current partner is artist Marcia Cushmore. They live in Minneapolis and Grand Marais, Minnesota.
