= Elizabeth Erickson =

American painter

- Known for: Painting
- Movement: Women's Art Registry of Minnesota, Feminist Art Movement

Elizabeth Erickson (1942–2024) was an American painter, feminist artist, poet, and educator. Her painting style leaned towards gestural abstraction, and the themes she explored occupied "the territories of ancient myth, religion, and spiritual feminism," according to art historian Joanna Inglot.

== Early life and education ==
Erickson was born into a middle-class Catholic family in Austin, Minnesota; her mother was a nurse and homemaker and her father was an entrepreneur. In 1964, she earned her B.A. from the College of Saint Teresa in Winona, Minnesota, and in 1998 she earned her M.F.A. in painting from the Minneapolis College of Art and Design.

== Work and career ==
Erickson was a founding member of the Women's Art Registry of Minnesota, also known as WARM. Spurred on by the coastal initiatives of the Feminist Art Movement in the United States, WARM began in 1976 as a women's art collective aimed at establishing "a center for women’s art that would lead to [its members'] recognition as professional artists."

In 1985, Erickson created a painting that is ambitious in both theme and scale called The Temple of Breath. The painting is constructed in a grid of twelve individual square paintings that together aim to reconcile the corporeal and cerebral acts of painting in a kind of visualization of meditation. Art historian Joanna Inglot explains: "By dividing each panel horizontally and vertically into grid-like sections, repeating black circular shapes in counterpoint with white diamonds and carefully measuring intervals between the forms, Erickson creates a sensation of expansion and contraction, 'in-and-out' movement throughout the entire composition. (...) [This painting] evolved out of years of quiet meditation at the Minnesota Zen Center." At the same time, Erickson's preoccupation with the grid format emerges from something deeper out of her childhood memory of a county road outside of Austin, where the viewer meets the landscape.

In the 1990s, Erickson embarked on a series of abstract paintings inspired by the life and art of the twelfth-century German Benedictine abbess Hildegard of Bingen, whose preoccupation with language, light, and female spirituality remain a source of inspiration for Erickson. In her painting titled 101 Names of God: Awakener of Eternal Spring from 1996, Erickson creates a bristling field of short, white marks against a cobalt background interrupted in the upper center by a thin, vertical rectangular shape stippled with red mark; the painting appears to breathe and glow from within.

The natural world is also a touchstone – both visual and spiritual – for Erickson's art. For example, the waterfall known as Minnehaha Falls in Minnehaha Park (Minneapolis) has figured in her work since the late 1990s in a series of paintings-on-paper that present variations on the same theme. A beloved natural landmark in the Twin Cities, the waterfall ebbs and flows with the seasons, and its fluctuating spirit is palpable in Erickson's depictions. In Minnehaha Falls; Subtle World (1997), a thick vertical shape representing the Falls' cascade dominates the composition, suggesting an abiding force that is also, as the title recommends and as apparent in the long steady brushstrokes that describe the falls, quite subtle.

In 2009, Erickson was recognized, along with fellow feminist artist and educator Patricia Olson, as a Changemaker by the Minnesota Women's Press for her role in founding in 1999 the Women's Art Institute, a summer studio intensive for women co-sponsored by the Minneapolis College of Art and Design and St. Catherine University.

=== Selected solo and group exhibitions ===
- 2014 – Now and Then, Kinds of Light, Form+Content Gallery, Minneapolis, MN
- 2010 – Gardens for Winter, Form+Content Gallery, Minneapolis, MN
- 2006 – WARM: A Feminist Art Collective in Minnesota, Weisman Art Museum, Minneapolis, MN
- 2001 – Elizabeth Erickson: Painting as Journey, Catherine G. Murphy Gallery, College of St. Catherine, St. Paul, MN
- 1998 – Amartithi in India (Sabbatical exhibition), Minneapolis College of Art and Design, Minneapolis, MN
- 1997 – Mother Print Project, collaboration/installation with Judy Stone Nunneley, Steensland Museum, St. Olaf College, Northfield, MN
- 1988 – Matter of Spirit, Spirit of Matter, Erickson, Mazarra, Soho 20 Gallery, New York, NY
- 1986 – Structure and Metaphor, Six Contemporary Visions, WARM Gallery, Minneapolis, MN
- 1984 – Elizabeth Erickson/Marjorie Alexander, Catherine G. Murphy Gallery, College of St. Catherine, St. Paul, MN
- 1982 – The Dark Core, Erickson, Bart, Macalester College Galleries, St. Paul, MN
- 1980 – Elizabeth Erickson: Recent Work, WARM Gallery, Minneapolis, MN
- 1979 – Art of the Region, Walker Art Center, Minneapolis, MN
- 1979 – Elizabeth Erickson, College Gallery, Saint Mary's College, Winona, MN

=== Selected public collections ===
- Edward G. Robinson Collection, Los Angeles, CA
- Federal Reserve Bank, Minneapolis, MN
- General Mills, Minneapolis MN
- University of Minnesota Gallery, Minneapolis, MN
- Minneapolis Institute of Art, Minneapolis, MN
- Minnesota Historical Society, St. Paul, MN
- Walker Art Center, Minneapolis, MN

=== Awards and nominations ===
- 2001 – Minnesota State Arts Board Opportunity Grant
- 1994 – Research Grant for Mother Print Project, Minneapolis College of Art and Design
- 1985 – Minnesota State Arts Board Purchase Grant
- 1984 – Mellon Grant, Minneapolis College of Art and Design
- 1983 – WARM Mentor Program Grant
