= Linda Gammell =

American photographer and artist (born 1948)

- Born: 1948 (age 77–78)
- Education: University of Minnesota
- Known for: photography, collage, book arts
- Notable work: Landscape of Hope and Despair (1989)
- Movement: Feminist art movement
- Website: lindagammell.com

Linda Gammell (born 1948) is an American photographer and artist. A founding member of the discontinued Women's Art Resources of Minnesota (WARM) collective, Gammell's work focuses on themes of gender, nature, agriculture, culture, and power dynamics.

== Education ==
Gammell was born in 1948 and grew up in Lake City, Minnesota. She received both a Bachelor of Arts in journalism and mass communication (1972) and a Master of Fine Arts in photography (1979) from the University of Minnesota.

== Career ==
In the early 1970s, Gammell became involved in the Twin Cities' art and feminism scenes. She was active in the Women's Film Collective and was one of the founding members of WARM, frequently working as a photographer for the collective to document events and exhibitions. Gammell cites meeting Ruth Bernhard at a Wisconsin workshop during this time as deeply influential, particularly in deconstructing the male gaze. In 1974, Gammell documented the Dinkytown, Cedar-Riverside, and University neighborhoods of Minneapolis as a work for hire with the Minneapolis Public Library.

Using techniques like self-portraiture and collage, Gammell explored the female body and cultural differences in works such as Jalousie (1977) and East/West: False Portrait of a Culture (1980–83). Along with fellow WARM collective member Sandra Menefee Taylor, she collaborated with historian Jo Blatti to produce an artist's book titled Landscape of Hope and Despair (1989), documenting the experiences of a rural Minnesotan community. Gammell and Taylor would continue themes of representing rural individuals in Farmer's Daughter: Dirt in Our Bones (1988–2006) and The One About the Farmer's Daughter: Stereotypes and Self-Portraits (1994). With fellow WARM collective member Dorothy Odland, Gammell helped to analyze the Walker Art Center's basement archives' statistics and concluded that there was a lack of women artists in the Walker's exhibitions. WARM successfully used these statistics to lobby for more exhibitions of women artists and inclusive reviews.

Gammell was associate professor of art and design at the Minneapolis College of Art and Design for 20 years, and has served as a visiting and adjunct professor at Colorado College, St. Olaf College, Hamline University, and the College of Visual Arts.

Gammell's work in photography and book arts has been collected by institutions including the Minneapolis Institute of Art and the Walker Art Center. In 2022, her piece Orchard, September (for Morris) (2012) was included in the Denver Art Museum's exhibit Other People's Pictures: Gifts from the Robert and Kerstin Adams Collection. Along with other members of WARM, Gammell's work was featured in a 50-year anniversary exhibition in April 2026.
