= F16x9 =

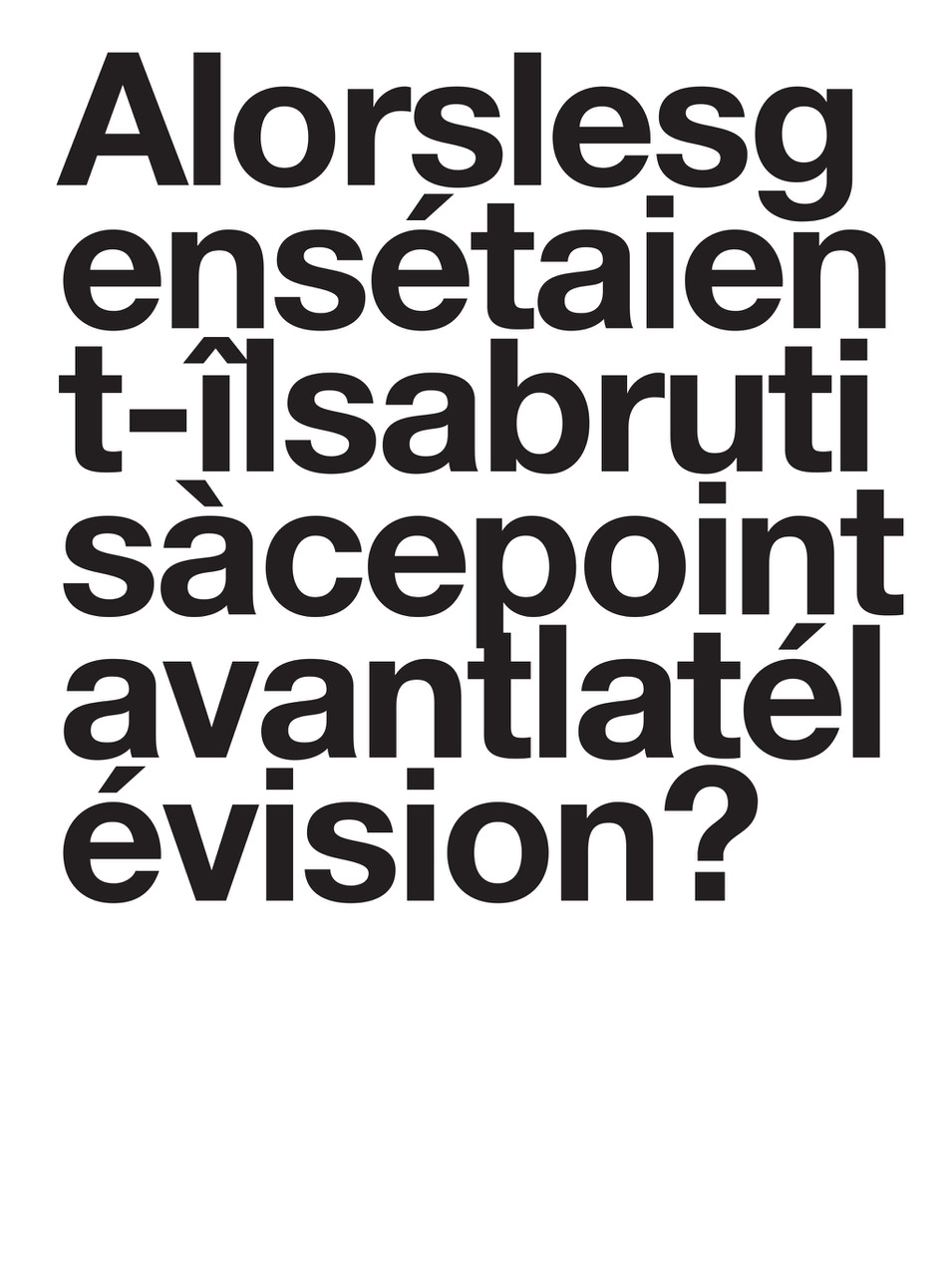
Liam Gillick cover of FLY16x9

F16x9 is an American multimedia moving image collective founded by Stephen Blaise and Catherine Camille Cushman.

Located in New York City, the collective began as FLY DVD Magazine in 2003 when Blaise and Cushman had the idea of merging analog and digital technology. With the launch of the ZERO issue in December 2005 and the instant critical acclaim it received, this concept was fully realized in the form of a physical multi-media DVD magazine.

With a circulation of 7,500, FLY DVD became the next step in the evolution of the traditional print publication as the world's first high-definition ‘Motion Media Magazine’, merging the mediums of film and technology. Style.com described it as “The first fully digital fashion magazine, where music meets art meets video." LVMH’s Veuve Clicquot became the global sponsor and their signature Veuve Clicquot Yellow was in each FLY DVD. Retailers such as London’s Dover Street Market, Colette in Paris, 10 Corso Como in Milan, Restir in Tokyo, and the MoMA design store in NY carried the title.

By 2009, DVD technology was becoming obsolete and Blaise and Cushman decided to cease publication of a physical magazine, launching the web portal FLY16x9. By doing so, Fly became the first media channel to provide original editorial content in the form of moving fashion films.

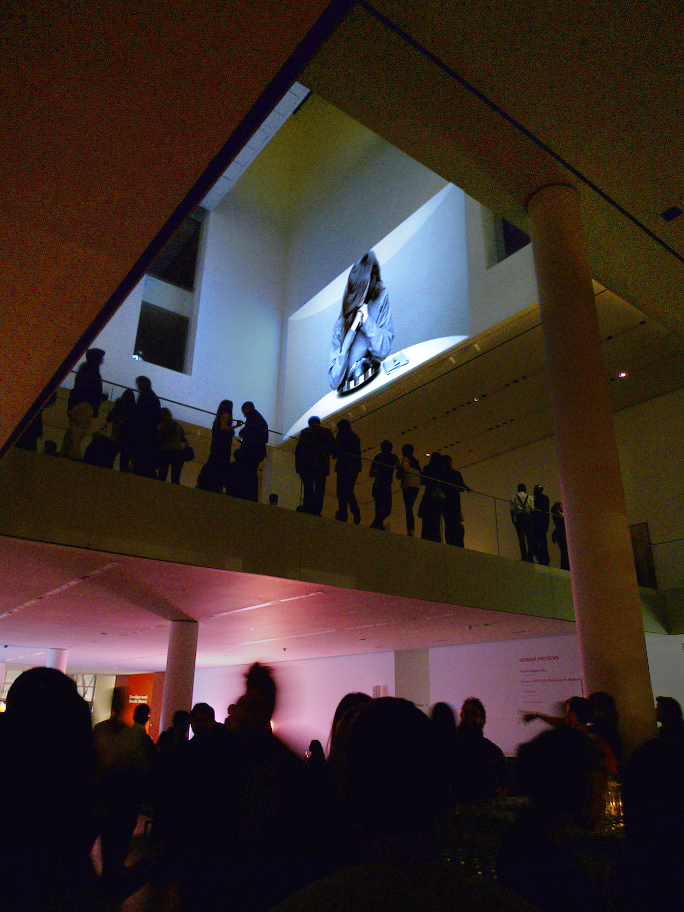
Cake film viewing at MoMA

The artist collective has exhibited in major international art institutions and had films screened worldwide including the ICA London, the NOOVO Festival in Santiago de Compostela, Spain, FOAM Museum in Amsterdam, along with the Stedelijk Museum (created in collaboration with the artist Liam Gillick). In addition, exhibits and screenings included the Museum of Modern Art in New York, which Vanity Fair described as “mesmerizing”. as well as the Deutsche Guggenheim in Berlin, SVA Theater in Chelsea, New York, the Centre Pompidou, Paris, the Wooster Art Museum (Ebert Art Center) and at the Architecture and Design Film Festival.
