= Aaron Spangler =

American sculptor

- Born: 1971; Minneapolis, Minnesota
- Education: Minneapolis College of Art and Design – BFA degree (1993)
- Known for: Sculpture, printmaking
- Movement: Contemporary art
- Awards: 2010 – McKnight Artist Fellowship for Visual Artists; 1998 – Minnesota State Arts Board Fellowship; 1997 – Jerome Foundation Travel and Study Grant

Aaron Spangler (born 1971 in Minneapolis, Minnesota) is a sculptor and printmaker who lives and works in Park Rapids, Minnesota.

== Life ==
He attended the Minneapolis College of Art and Design, earning his BFA degree in 1993. He is represented by Horton Gallery in New York City.

Spangler's sculptures typically consist of carved solid blocks of basswood that are finished with coats of black gesso and graphite. Spangler carves his sculptures using mallets, chisels, and a Dremel-style rotary tool. Ken Johnson commented that, ""You don't see much wood carving in elite Chelsea galleries. An antiquated craft with little relevance to modern technologies of communication or to a competitive, fast-paced contemporary art market...so it is exciting to come upon the large, intricate reliefs". Spangler works three-dimensionally and in bas-relief, a challenging and intricate medium. His work is often concerned with "war's devastation and its potential as a metaphor for psychological conflict" as well as "anarchy in rural America". His sculptures seek to envision a "fascinating and frightening revolution against passive consumerism 'of the people, by the people'" Multi-faceted, his work reveals more upon second and third glances; shifting scale and perspective propelling the viewer deeper into the psyche of the piece, leading one critic to claim that Spangler piled "images and motifs, just like ancient Romans heaped up captured armor and weapons as trophies". Spangler has transformed "a marginalized craft typically associated with bearded, plaid-shirted gentlemen of a certain age into a conduit for the mythology of the Midwest without diminishing its tactility or symbolic richness".

== Notable exhibitions ==
- 2011 Gothic, Southeastern Center for Contemporary Art Center, Winston-Salem, NC (with Allison Taylor)
- 2011 A Simple Heart: Der Kleiner Mann (with Dana Frankfort), La Montagne Gallery, Boston, MA
- 2010 Government Whore, Horton Gallery, New York City
- 2009 Paranoid Defenders, Galerie Michael Janssen, Berlin, DE
- 2007 Zach Feuer Gallery, New York City
- 2006 Kantor/Feuer Gallery, Los Angeles
- 2005 Zach Feuer Gallery, New York City
- 2003 Sundown, Rare Plus Gallery, New York City
- 2002 Dissident Aggressor, The Soap Factory, Minneapolis, MN
- 2000 City Limits, Franklin Art Works, Minneapolis, MN
- 1999 Aaron Spangler: New Work, Thomas Barry Fine Arts, Minneapolis, MN

== Awards and Grants ==
- 2010 McKnight Artist Fellowship for Visual Artists
- 1998 Minnesota State Arts Board Fellowship
- 1997 Jerome Foundation Travel and Study Grant

== Collections ==
- Armand Hammer Museum of Art and Culture Center at UCLA, Los Angeles
- Art Gallery of Ontario, Toronto, Canada
- Minneapolis Institute of Art
- The Progressive Collection, Cleveland
- Richard Massey Foundation, New York City
- Rubell Family Collection, Miami
- Saatchi Gallery, London
- Takashi Murakami, Tokyo
- Walker Art Center, Minneapolis
- Wellington Management Collection, Boston
