= Judith Roode =

American artist and teacher (1943–2018)

Judith Ann Johnson Roode
- Born: 1943
- Died: August 25, 2018 (aged 74–75)
- Known for: visual arts, drawing
- Website: https://judithroode.com/

Judith Roode (1943–2018) was an American artist and teacher. From 1977 to 1992 Roode taught drawing at the Minneapolis College of Art and Design. Her artwork is included in the collections of the Minneapolis Institute of Art, Walker Art Center, Weisman Art Museum, among others. During her career, her work was widely exhibited, particularly at colleges and universities.

== Work and career ==
From 1977 to 1992, Roode was a professor at the Minneapolis College of Art and Design, where she taught Life Drawing and Visual Journals courses. Throughout her career Roode was an active member of the Women's Art Resources of Minnesota (WARM) and served as the program's first director until 1988. In 1982, Roode created a mentor program for WARM that paired successful, established artists with emerging protégés. Over 450 women artists have been served by the mentorship program since its inception.

She used live models for much of her work, creating large-scale, gestural charcoal and graphite drawings as explorations of the female body. In the 1990s, Roode retired from teaching to manage a painful medical condition that limited her mobility, reflex sympathetic dystrophy.

== Selected solo and group exhibitions ==
- 2008 – Judith Roode BODY SONGS, A 25-Year Retrospective, 1967-1991, January 28 – March 2, 2008, Catherine G. Murphy Gallery, College of St. Catherine, St. Paul, MN
- 2013 - The House We Built: Feminist Art Then and Now, January 22 – February 23, 2013, Katherine E. Nash Gallery, Regis Center for Art, University of Minnesota
- 2018 - Roots and Fruits: Exploring the History and Impact of the Women’s Art Registry of Minnesota, November 3 – December 18, 2018, Catherine G. Murphy Gallery, College of St. Catherine, St. Paul, MN

== Selected public collections ==
- Minneapolis Institute of Art, Minneapolis, MN
- Minnesota Historical Society, Saint Paul, MN
- Walker Art Center, Minneapolis, MN
- Weisman Art Museum, Minneapolis, MN
