= Phoebe Washburn =

American installation artist (born 1973)

- Born: 1973 (age 52–53); Poughkeepsie, New York
- Education: School of Visual Arts, New York; Tulane University

Phoebe Washburn (born 1973) is an American installation artist who lives and works in New York City. Washburn is best known for producing large-scale installations: assemblages of garbage, detritus, cardboard, scrap wood, and, more recently, organic matter such as sod or plants. Her early, site-specific installations transform gallery spaces into captivating architectural experiences.

== Career ==
She holds a BFA from Tulane University and an MFA from School of Visual Arts. Her work has been exhibited around the world at Institute of Contemporary Art 2007, Deutsche Guggenheim 2007 and Whitney Biennial 2008. She is represented by Zach Feuer Gallery in New York.

Washburn is a process-based artist. She creates installations with help of assistants, due to the colossal size and labor-intensive methods she requires. Processes are architectural in nature including stacking, blinding, nailing, etc. The pieces tend to look organic, mirroring the processes, but also have that haphazard, precarious appeal as they are often stacked up with chairs or other props. The overall resulting work is reliant on the gallery space. Washburn dubs this 'spontaneous architecture' and continues by adding:

"My sculptures depend a lot on the spaces where they are shown because they often are anchored into the wall but chance is definitely more of a factor in the final product than is any predetermined design. I just let the structures evolve by repeating the same action again and again. The process has a slightly neurotic element in that it involves adding little behavior habits. As silly as it sounds, I often feel as if my assistants and I are beavers building a dam. The shapes are less about form than they are about the activity involved in amassing and assembling the forms."

A sample installation, Vacational Trappings and Wildlife Worries (exhibited during the summer of 2007 at Philadelphia's Institute of Contemporary Art) involved the creation of a "barrel-vaulted walkway made from hundreds of scrap-wood pieces" featuring several niches containing water, shrimp, snails, aquatic plants, and small objects, yielding what Washburn called a 'poor man's aquarium'.

An earlier work, Heavy Has Debt, (exhibited in 2003 in Grinnell, Iowa), was a "massive, shingled wall of debris," produced largely from mounted cardboard.

She chooses to give her works titles after they have been installed.

== Exhibitions ==
=== Solo ===
- 2002—Between Sweet and Low, LFL Gallery, New York, NY
- 2003—True, False and Slightly Better, Rice University Gallery, Rice University, Houston, TX
- 2003—Heavy has Debt, Faulconer Gallery, Grinnell University, Grinnell, IA
- 2004—Greed. The Landscape Maker, Lerimonti Gallery, Milan, Italy
- 2004—Bored Buys Options, The Weatherspoon Art Gallery, Greensboro, NC
- 2004—Nothing’s Cutie, LFL Gallery, New York, NY
- 2005—It Makes For My Billionaire Status, Kantor/Feuer Gallery, Los Angeles, CA
- 2005—It Has No Secret Surprise, UCLA Hammer Museum, Los Angeles, CA
- 2006—2 BLT’s (Bought and Lovely Towns), Lipstick Building, 53rd and 3rd, New York, NY
- 2007—Vacational Trappings and Wildlife Worries, Institute of Contemporary Art, Philadelphia, PA
- 2007—Regulated Fool’s Milk Meadow, Deutsche Guggenheim, Berlin, Germany
- 2008—Tickle the Shitstem, Zach Feuer Gallery, New York, NY
- 2009—Compeshitstem: the new deal, Kestnergesellschaft, Hannover, Germany
- 2011—Temperatures in a Lab of Superior Specialness, Mary Boone Gallery, New York, NY
- 2011—Nunderwater Nort Lab, Zach Feuer Gallery, New York, NY
- 2012—My Rubies and My Diamonds, Josée Bienvenu Gallery, New York, NY
- 2012—Nudes, Housed Within Their Own Clothes and Aware of Their Individual Thirst, Descending a Staircase, National Academy Museum, New York, NY
- 2013—Pressure Drop for Richard Stands (a history of one thing to another in lemon-aideness), Kunsthallen Brandts, Odense, Denmark
- 2026—Sacred Love (call me by my tool name, The Mill, Westport, NY

=== Group ===
- 1997—Breakout, Rosetree Gallery, New Orleans, LA
- 1998—An Artist’s Eye, The Greensboro Artists' League, Greensboro, NC
- 1998—Invitational Show, Radiance Gallery, Greensboro, NC
- 1999—Tree, Installation, Silverwood Street, Philadelphia, PA
- 1999—The Shape of Things to Come, Forma Gallery, New York, NY
- 2001—Integrated Aesthetics, School of Visual Arts Satellite Gallery, Brooklyn, NY
- 2002—All You Can Eat, Visual Arts Gallery, School of Visual Arts, New York, NY
- 2002—Everyday Materials, Westside Gallery, New York, NY
- 2002—DNA @DNA, DNA Gallery, Provincetown, MA
- 2002—Art New York, kunstraume auf Zeit, Linz, Austria
- 2003—Rubbish, Cuchifritos, New York, NY; Mixture Gallery, Houston, TX; Center for Curatorial Studies Museum, Bard College, Annandale-on-Hudson, NY
- 2004—Slice and Dice, Visual Arts Gallery, School of Visual Arts, New York, NY
- 2004—Beginning Here: 101 Ways, Visual Arts Gallery, School of Visual Arts, New York, NY
- 2004—Seconds of Something, P.S. 1, Long Island City, NY
- 2004—AIM 22: Artist in the Marketplace, Bronx Museum of the Arts, NY
- 2005—Strange Architecture, Catherine Clark Gallery, San Francisco, CA
- 2005—Greater New York 2005, P.S. 1, Long Island City, NY
- 2005—American Academy Invitational Exhibition of Painting and Sculpture, American Academy of Arts and Letters, New York, NY
- 2005—Make It Now, Sculpture Center, Long Island City, NY
- 2005—The Bench, Kunsthalle St Gallen, St Gallen, Switzerland
- 2006—The Studio Visit, Exit Art, New York, NY
- 2006—Ping Pong Diplomacy, The Kemper Museum, Kansas City, MO
- 2006—Wallpaper LAB, Lennon, Weinberg Gallery, New York, NY
- 2006—Burgeoning Geometries, Whitney Museum at Altria, New York, NY
- 2008—The Way Things Go, Susan Inglett, New York, NY
- 2008—microwave, six, Josée Bienvenu Gallery, New York, NY
- 2008—The Whitney Biennial, Whitney Museum of American Art, New York, NY
- 2009—Couples & Relations, DREI Raum für Gegenwartskunst, Cologne, Germany
- 2009—microwave, seven, Judi Rotenberg Gallery, Boston, MA
- 2009—Back to the Garden, 60 Wall Gallery, Deutsche Bank, New York, NY
- 2010—Open, Zach Feuer Gallery, New York, NY
- 2010—Reconstruct + Deconstruction, Visual Arts Center, Courtyard Gallery, The University of Texas, Austin, TX
- 2010—natural renditions, Marlborough Gallery, New York, NY
- 2010—Contemplating the Void, Solomon R. Guggenheim Museum, New York, NY
- 2011—In Bloom, Susanne Hilberry Gallery, Ferndale, MI
- 2011—The Influentials, Visual Arts Gallery, School of Visual Arts, New York, NY
- 2012—Paper Space: Drawings by Sculptors, Inman Gallery, Houston, TX
- 2012—Against the Grain: Wood in Contemporary Art, Craft and Design, Mint Museum, Charlotte, NC; Museum of Arts and Design, New York, NY; Museum of Art, Fort Lauderdale, FL
- 2012—Flights From Wonder, Santa Barbara Contemporary Arts Forum, Santa Barbara, CA
- 2013—A Discourse on Plants, RH Gallery, New York, NY
- 2014—There is no such thing as a good decision, Josée Bienvenu, New York, NY
