= New Art Dealers Alliance =

Arts organization

New Art Dealers Alliance (NADA)
- Established: 2002
- Type: Non-Profit Arts Organization
- Director: Heather Hubbs
- Website: www.newartdealers.org

The New Art Dealers Alliance (NADA) is a 501(c)(6) not-for-profit collective of professionals working with contemporary art. NADA members include galleries, gallery directors, non-profit art spaces, art advisors, curators, writers, museum and other art professionals from around the world. In addition to hosting year-round programming for its members, NADA hosts two art fairs annually: NADA New York and NADA Miami.

== History ==
NADA was founded in 2002 by board members Sheri L. Pasquarella, John Connelly, Zach Miner, and Zach Feuer as a collective of young art professionals predominantly based in New York. After a successful inaugural year of NADA Miami Beach, held in December 2003, Heather Hubbs was appointed the Director of NADA. In 2012, NADA launched the New York edition of its art fair, NADA New York.

NADA is a 501(c) 6 nonprofit organization.

=== NADA Miami ===
NADA first launched the art fair concurrent with Art Basel in Miami in 2003, with a small number of exhibiting galleries in a vacant space located off of Lincoln Road near the Convention Center. In 2004, NADA director Heather Hubbs moved the fair to the Ice Palace, where the fair was held for five years. In 2009, NADA Miami Beach moved the Deauville Beach Resort. In 2015, NADA held the fair at Fontainebleau Miami Beach, and has since returned to Ice Palace Studios.

=== NADA New York ===
The first NADA New York opened at the Center 548, the former Dia Art Foundation Center, in 2012, simultaneous with the Frieze Art Fair. From 2013–2016, the fair was held at Pier 36 Basketball City on the Lower East Side. NADA New York has since moved its dates to March, and has moved to the Skylight venues on the west side. Like the fair in Miami, NADA New York is dedicated to showcasing new art, and celebrating rising talents from around the globe.

== Activities ==
From 2012–2016 NADA partnered with Art Cologne, the world's oldest art fair, to showcase emerging galleries from around the world at Koelnmesse during Art Cologne. In 2012, NADA announced COLLABORATIONS, a curated sector of Art Cologne in which exhibitors present with the theme of collaboration as a starting point, often co-presenting in a shared booth.

NADA has organized events such as NADA Hudson, a sculpture exhibition at the Basilica Hudson, NADA County Affair, a recurring artist-run county fair, and fundraising events such as the Beach Painting Club Auction to benefit the Rockaways
