= Women's Art Resources of Minnesota =

Women's art organization based in Minnesota, U.S.

Women's Art Resources of Minnesota (WARM) was a women's art organization based in the U.S. state of Minnesota. Founded in 1976 as Women's Art Registry of Minnesota, a feminist artist collective, the organization operated the WARM Gallery in downtown Minneapolis from 1976 to 1991. WARM discontinued in 2021.

== History ==
=== Early years ===
WARM originated during the feminist art movement of the early 1970s. Gatherings in the studios and homes of women artists in the Twin Cities led to the beginning of the Women's Art Registry of Minnesota in the winter of 1973 with the establishment of a slide registry of women artists from Minnesota by Lynn Lockie Warkov and Susan Fiene. The group organized their own exhibitions and gathered statistics on the representation of women in the Minneapolis Institute of Art and the Walker Art Center. That year artist Judy Chicago spoke at the University of Minnesota and the College of St. Catherine about her Feminist Art Program at the California Institute of the Arts. The next year Chicago, Miriam Shapiro, and educators from the College of St. Catherine laid the foundations for WARM. At the Mid-west Women's Artists' Conference in Michigan in 1975, attendees from Minneapolis learned about the practicalities of maintaining a cooperatively run gallery.

The Women's Art Registry of Minnesota was founded as a cooperative by 37 women artists in 1976. It was the first feminist art cooperative in Minnesota. The group was non-hierarchical, with all members serving on the organization's governing body. They registered as a non-profit on January 28, 1976. They limited the membership to 40 people, who were required to pay dues, attend monthly meetings, and spend at least 300 hours annually on activities related to the organization and gallery.

=== WARM Gallery (1976–1991) ===
In 1976 the WARM collective established WARM: A Women's Collective Artspace (also known as the WARM Gallery) in a former millinery store in Minneapolis' Warehouse District in the Wyman Building at 414 First Avenue North. In 1972 New York City's A.I.R. Gallery had become the first women's cooperative gallery in the United States. WARM Gallery was one of number of cooperative artist galleries established by women using A.I.R. as a model. The WARM Gallery hosted solo and group exhibitions by invited women artists and from its membership. Visiting artists at the gallery included the painters Grace Hartigan, Alice Neel, Joan Semmel and Joan Snyder.

WARM began offering the Feminist Perspectives monthly lecture series in 1980. The program was directed by Joyce Lyon and succeeded in bringing art critics and historians such as Linda Nochlin, Robin Morgan, Lucy Lippard, and Germaine Greer through the group's visiting artists program. The series continued until 1984.

In 1980 the WARM newsletter expanded to the quarterly WARM Journal. Designed by Patricia Olson, the periodical featured fiction and poetry from Minnesota women in addition to articles on art. The journal's editorial committee was chaired by Susan McDonald, Alice Towle, Marty Nash and Elizabeth Erickson until 1985 when Phyllis Wiener took over. By 1985 the journal's circulation had risen to nearly 5000. Informed by cultural feminism, WARM Journal was one of the few interdisciplinary publications in the area and for a time it was the only art magazine published regularly in the Twin Cities. The WARM Journal ceased publication in 1987.

Catherine Jordan was hired as the gallery's coordinator in 1981. She became executive director of WARM the following year. The collective established the WARM Mentor Program in 1982. Emerging artists are paired with professionals for the two-year program. A more intensive program, the WARM Mentor Intensive Program, lasts one to three months.

In October 1986, WARM hosted a national conference at the Minneapolis Plaza Hotel called "The Contemporary Women in the Visual Arts". The conference featured speakers such as Wilhelmina Holladay, artist June Wayne, and Janet Wolff. WARM Gallery and other galleries in the Twin Cities featured women artists during the conference. WARM also sponsored a traveling exhibition featuring artist Harmony Hammond.

Following the conference, WARM found itself in significant debt. Shortly after the opening of the nearby Target Center sports complex in October 1990, parking and traffic problems worsened and the gallery experienced a decline in visitors. Unable to keep up with rising rents, the board made a decision to close WARM Gallery in January 1991. They retained the non-profit and the Mentor Program, moving to an office on University Avenue in St. Paul before relocating to the Women's Building on Rice Street.

== Post-gallery era ==
The Women's Art Registry of Minnesota continued to hold exhibitions for its members. In addition to its educational and professional programs, WARM maintained an online art registry of local and regional artists and published an e-newsletter. WARM changed its name to Women's Art Resources of Minnesota in 2010.

== Legacy ==
The WARM Gallery provided an important exhibition space outside of mainstream venues for Minnesota women artists. It was a catalyst for economic renewal in the Warehouse District and played an important role in the development of arts in Minneapolis. WARM served as a key Midwestern node in the early feminist art movement in the United States.

The University of Minnesota's Weisman Art Museum held an exhibition of work from 12 of WARM's long-term members in 2006. The exhibition was documented in Joanna Inglot's 2007 book WARM: A Feminist Art Collective in Minnesota. The book includes a history of WARM and entries for each of the 12 artists featured in the exhibition. On WARM's 40-year anniversary in 2013, exhibitions were held at both the University of Minnesota's Katherine E. Nash Gallery and Robbin Gallery.

The Minnesota Historical Society holds records and media related to WARM in its collections.

WARM discontinued in January 2021.

== Selected members ==
- Harriet Bart, conceptual artist
- Hazel Belvo, painter and draftswoman
- Sally Brown, draftswoman
- Elizabeth Erickson, painter
- Carole Fisher, installation artist
- Linda Gammell, photographer
- Vesna Kittelson, painter
- Joyce Lyon, draftswoman and landscape artist
- Susan McDonald, painter and printmaker
- Patricia Olson, painter and graphic designer
- Judith Roode, figure drawings, mentor, teacher
- Sandra Menefee Taylor, painter, sculptor and performance artist
- Jantje Visscher, painter and printmaker
