= Lisa Nankivil =

American artist (born 1958)

- Born: 1958; Minneapolis, Minnesota
- Education: Minneapolis College of Art and Design - BFA in Painting
- Known for: Painting, drawing, printmaking, monoprinting
- Movement: Contemporary art, abstract art
- Awards: 2011 - Artist Initiative Grant, Minnesota Arts and Cultural Heritage Fund; 2004 - Jerome Foundation Fellowship

Lisa Nankivil (born 1958, Minneapolis, Minn.) is a contemporary American painter and printmaker.

== Life and work ==
Nankivil grew up in Winona, Minnesota, an historic Mississippi River town located in the bluff country of southwest Minnesota, where her family owned Sahaptin Farm, an Appaloosa horse breeding operation. Nankivil was herself a junior champion rider.

Upon graduating high school, Nankivil moved to San Francisco where she studied graphic design and worked for several years as an independent art director in the film and advertising industries. She later returned to college to study painting and printmaking at the University of Minnesota in Minneapolis. Nankivil continued her studio art training at the Minneapolis College of Art and Design, where she earned a BFA degree in painting in 1995.

Magenta, 2005, oil on canvas, Collection Frederick R. Weisman Art Museum, Minneapolis

Nankivil is best known for her non-representational striped-format oil paintings and abstract monoprints. Though her work shares formal qualities with the modernist innovations of European and American abstraction, her paintings typically feature color schemes, brushwork, and techniques based on long-established painterly traditions.

According to art historian William Peterson, the striped format of Nankivil's paintings evolved while she was concentrating on certain figure-ground relationships in her work. “I was searching for ways to make the background as essential as the image,” she says. “I began to explore qualities such as motion, ascendance, and hierarchy through painted stripes, and eventually the image fell away leaving me to navigate the implications of the vertical and the horizontal by painting only the orientations with stripes.” A phrase in the art writings of John Berger—“Home is where the vertical meets the horizontal”—helped her as she began to explore the physical, psychological, and spiritual dimensions of her discovery. “To me,” she says, “this phrase refers to a sense of spiritual well-being: finding ground in which to prosper.”

Nankivil is an artist-member of the Traffic Zone Center for Visual Art, a prominent artist cooperative established in 1993 in the historic Warehouse District of downtown Minneapolis, Minnesota, where she maintains her principal painting studio and private press.

In 2004, Nankivil was awarded the Jerome Foundation Fellowship (New York City & St. Paul). In 2011, Nankivil received an Artist Initiative Grant in Visual Arts from the Minnesota State Arts Board (St. Paul), with funding provided by Minnesota's Arts and Cultural Heritage Fund.

Nankivil's paintings and original prints are exhibited nationally and internationally and are found in many public and private collections, including the Minneapolis Institute of Art; Frederick R. Weisman Art Museum, Minneapolis; Minnesota Museum of American Art, St. Paul; North Dakota Museum of Art, Grand Forks; Scottsdale Museum of Contemporary Art, Arizona; Borusan Contemporary Art Museum, Istanbul, Turkey; Highpoint Center for Printmaking, Minneapolis; U.S. State Department, Washington, D.C.; Clinton Foundation, New York; Surdna Foundation, New York; and others.

Nankivil is represented by Marlborough Fine Art, New York. Thomas McCormick Gallery, Chicago; William Shearburn Gallery, St. Louis; Heather Gaudio Fine Art, New Canaan, Conn.; and Highpoint Editions, Minneapolis. Streetside Press of Minneapolis is the principal publisher of her monoprints and digital print editions.
