= Traffic Zone Center for Visual Art =

- Established: 1993
- Location: 250 Third Avenue North; Minneapolis, Minnesota, 55401; United States
- Type: Artist cooperative, art gallery
- Public transit access: Metro Transit; Transit Bus: Routes 3, 14, 16, 50, 94 / Third Avenue North & Washington Avenue North Light Rail: Blue Line / Target Field Station; Commuter Rail: Northstar Line / Target Field Station Metro Transit Interactive Map
- Website: www.trafficzoneart.com

The Traffic Zone Center for Visual Art (TZCVA) is an artist cooperative located in the historic Warehouse District of downtown Minneapolis, Minnesota, United States. Founded in 1993, TZCVA was established to create an artist-owned and managed building that provides stable, safe, and affordable studio, teaching and exhibition space for mid-career visual artists. TZCVA is a partnership between Artspace Projects, Inc., a leading national non-profit real estate developer for the arts, and a cooperative of 23 artist-members.

- Moline, Milburn and Stoddard Company
- U.S. National Register of Historic Places
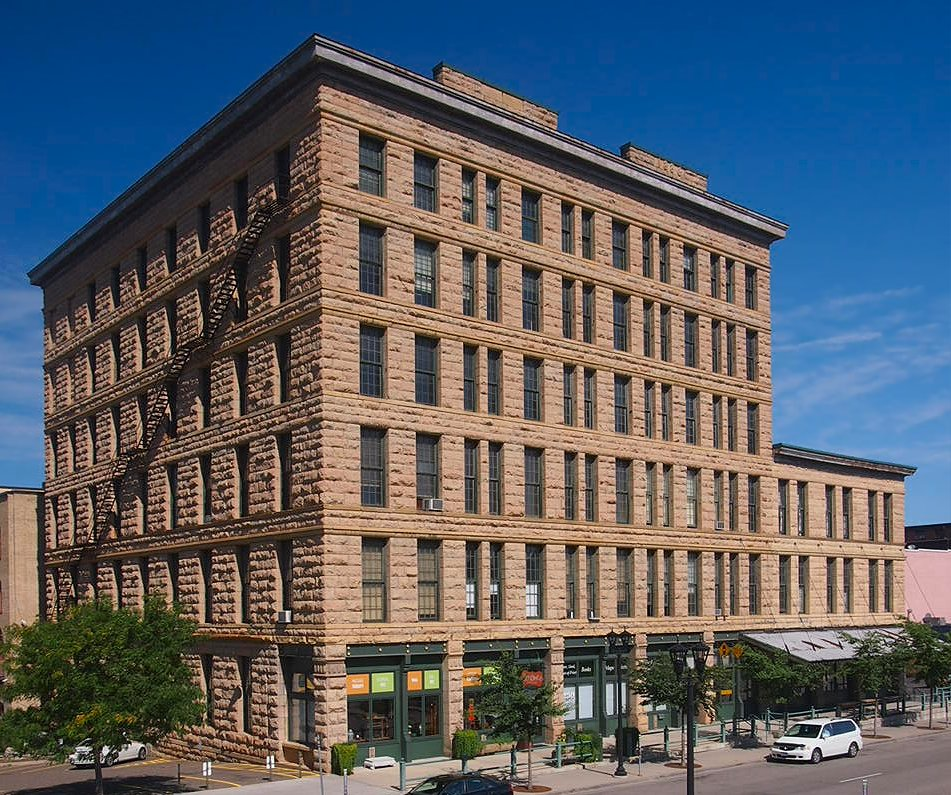
- The Moline, Milburn and Stoddard Company building from the south

- Location within Minnesota Location within the United States
- Location: Minneapolis, Minnesota
- Coordinates: 44°59′0.38″N 93°16′27.67″W
- Built: 1886
- Architect: Joseph Haley
- Architectural style: Chicago school
- NRHP reference No.: 75000986
- Added to NRHP: February 20, 1975

TZCVA is housed in a restored six-story Chicago-style limestone warehouse located in the North Loop neighborhood at 250 Third Avenue North, Minneapolis, Minnesota, 55401. The Traffic Zone building is of significant historic and architectural interest and is listed on the National Register of Historic Places (NRHP). Erected in 1886 for the Moline, Milburn and Stoddard Company as a warehouse for storing farm machinery and implements, the building was expanded two years later and converted into a commercial bakery operated by the National Biscuit Company (Nabisco). From 1951 to 1992, it housed an appliance parts business. In 1992, the warehouse was purchased by Artspace Projects with financial assistance from the City of Minneapolis, the McKnight Foundation, the Dayton Hudson Foundation, the General Mills Foundation and other funders. Extensively renovated by LHB Engineers & Architects (Minneapolis), the restored warehouse re-opened in 1995 as the Traffic Zone Center for Visual Art. As of December 2023, the building is listed for sale as "an incredible opportunity for a commercial or residential adaptive reuse project."

Members of the TZCVA cooperative have included an eclectic, international mix of painters, photographers, printmakers, conceptual artists, sculptors, book artists, and ceramicists. Many are past recipients of fellowships and grants from the McKnight Foundation (Minneapolis); the Bush Foundation (St. Paul); the Jerome Foundation (New York & St. Paul); the Minnesota State Arts Board (St. Paul); the Pollock-Krasner Foundation, (New York); and the National Endowment for the Arts (Washington, D.C.).

As part of its community-oriented educational mission, TZCVA sponsors workshops, classes, presentations, and quarterly exhibitions of contemporary art by local, national, and international painters, sculptors, photographers, printmakers, book artists, and installation artists. Organized by co-op artists and guest curators, these exhibitions are presented in the Traffic Zone Gallery, the cooperative's ground floor exhibition space. TZCVA also hosts semi-annual "Open Studio" events to allow members of the community to meet co-op artists and view and purchase artwork in a studio setting.

Current TZCVA artist-members include Harriet Bart, Kristie Bretzke, Perci Chester, David Collins, Lisa Colwell, James Conaway, Jim Dryden, Jil Evans, Bette Globus Goodman, Bonnie Heller, Bruce Hudson-Bogaard, Vesna Kittelson, Paul Ka Yin Kwok, Lisa Nankivil, Jon Neuse, Howard Oransky, Steve Ozone, Rebecca Pavlenko, Patrick Kemal Pryor, Jodi Reeb, Wilber H. Schilling, Harold B. Stone, and Jantje Visscher.

Commercial and non-profit building tenants include Artspace Projects, Inc., Graywolf Press, Indulgence Press, James & Mary Laurie Booksellers, Pro-Choice Resources, among others.
