= Harriet Bart =

American conceptual artist (born 1941)

- Born: June 23, 1941 (age 85); Duluth, MN
- Education: University of Minnesota, BA
- Known for: Artist's books, conceptual art, installation, textiles
- Notable work: Processional (1977), Garment Registry (1999), Requiem: Inscribing the Names - American Soldiers Killed in Iraq (2003-11), Requiem: Enduring Afghanistan (2008-15), Drawn in Smoke (2010)
- Movement: Installation art

Harriet Bart (born 1941) is an American Minneapolis-based conceptual artist, known for her objects, installations, and artists books.

== Early life ==
Harriet Bart was born in 1941 in Duluth, Minnesota, and earned a degree in textiles from the University of Minnesota in 1976. At the age of 19, she married and went on to have three children. Before pursuing art, Bart worked as a dental hygienist.

== Career ==
Bart's work has been exhibited throughout the United States and Germany, and she has completed more than a dozen public art commissions in the United States, Japan, and Israel. She has been the recipient of fellowships from the Bush Foundation, McKnight Foundation, MacDowell Colony, Virginia Center for Creative Arts, NEA Arts Midwest, and the Minnesota State Arts Board.

Since 2000, Bart has published eleven artists books and has won three Minnesota Book Awards, most recently in 2015 for Ghost Maps. Her work is represented in notable collections, including the Jewish Museum, Metropolitan Museum of Art, New York Public Library, Library of Congress, National Gallery of Art, National Museum of Women in the Arts, Walker Art Center, Minneapolis Institute of Art, Weisman Art Museum, Yale University Art Gallery, Sackner Archive of Visual and Concrete Poetry. She is a guest lecturer, curator, and a founding member of the Women's Art Registry of Minnesota and the Traffic Zone Center for Visual Art in Minneapolis, MN.

== Select exhibitions ==
- Weisman Art Museum, Harriet Bart: Abracadabra and Other Forms of Protection – Minneapolis (2020)
- Driscoll Babcock, New York (2016, 2013, 2011)
- Walker Art Center, Minneapolis (2015, 2010, 2009)
- Minnesota Museum of American Art, St. Paul (2015, 2013, 1995)
- Minnesota Center for Book Arts (2015, 2012, 2011, 2007, 1994)
- CAFA Art Museum, Beijing (2012)
- Law Warschaw Gallery at Macalester College, St. Paul (2012)
- New York Center for Book Arts, New York (2012, 2006)
- Weisman Art Museum, Minneapolis (2012, 2007, 2006, 1998, 1997)
- Boston Athenæum (2011)
- Minneapolis Institute of Art, Minneapolis (2011, 1989, 1984)
- King Saint Stephen Museum, Székesfehérvár (2006)
- San Francisco Center for Book Art (2006)
- Center for Contemporary Art, Santa Fe (2003)
- Klingspor Museum, Offenbach (2003)
- Museum of Art and Design, New York (2003)
- Galerie Volker Marschall, Düsseldorf (2002)
- Columbia College, Chicago (2002)
- Minneapolis College of Art and Design, Minneapolis (2000, 1988, 1982)
- The Jewish Museum, New York (1996)
- Galerie Henn, Maastrict (1995)
- Galerie Horst Dietrich, Berlin (1995)
- Ibaraki Central Library Gallery, Ibaraki City Osaka (1992)
- W.A.R.M. Gallery (1986, 1977)

== Recognition ==
- Yaddo Residency (2018)
- McKnight Artist Fellowship (2017)
- Minnesota Book Artist Award, Ghost Maps (2015)
- McKnight Grant for Artists Finalist (2015)
- Minnesota State Arts Board Artist Initiative Grant (2013)
- McKnight Foundation Project Grant Finalist (2013)
- Forecast McKnight Foundation Mid-Career Public Artist Professional Development Grant (2012)
- Virginia Center for the Creative Arts Residency (2010)
- Bush Foundation Artist Fellowship Finalist (2012)
- Minnesota Book Award, The Poetry of Chance Encounters (2004)
- Minnesota Book Award, Garment Register (2002)
- Partnership 2000 – A Cultural Exchange Encounter (2001)
- Bush Foundation Visual Arts Fellowship (2000)
- MCAD/McKnight Foundation Fellowship (1999)
- Jerome Foundation Sculpture Plaza Commission (1996)
- Arts Midwest/NEA Regional Visual Arts Fellowship (1993)
- Mac Dowell Colony Fellowship (1990)

== Select collections ==
- Boston Athenæum
- Brown University
- Columbia University
- Duke University
- The Jewish Museum
- Library of Congress
- Metropolitan Museum of Art
- Minneapolis Institute of Art
- Minnesota Historical Society
- National Gallery of Art
- National Museum of Women in the Arts
- New York Public Library
- Sackner Archive of Visual and Concrete Poetry
- Smith College
- University of Minnesota
- University of Washington
- Walker Art Center
- Weisman Art Museum
- Wesleyan University
- Yale University
