= Tuesday Bassen =

American illustrator and designer

Tuesday Bassen is an illustrator and apparel designer currently based in Berlin, Germany.

== Career ==
Tuesday Bassen was born in Nebraska and attended the Minneapolis College of Art and Design. After living in New York, she moved to Los Angeles for a number of years before relocating to Berlin, Germany in 2023. After working as an illustrator, she worked as a product designer for clients like Urban Outfitters before spinning off her own self-titled apparel and accessory brand, Tuesday of California, and founding her store FriendMart.

== Controversy ==
On July 20, 2016, Bassen publicly accused the clothing retailer Zara of expressly copying designs from her brand without crediting her. First in an Instagram post, and then in several other publications, Bassen claimed that Zara had created several enamel pins which closely matched those designed by her brand, Tuesday Bassen. She then explained that after sending Zara a cease-and-desist letter, her complaint had been denied by the retailer. Zara then suspended the sale of all the items mentioned. However, Bassen's action caused many other artists to join in accusing Zara of violating their copyrights; Bassen then founded the website ShopArtTheft with another artist Adam J. Kurtz, as a store where artists could sell the originals that Zara had copied.
