= Margaret Gove Camfferman =

American painter (1881–1964)

Margaret Gove Camfferman (1881 – 1964) was an American painter.

She was born Margaret Gove in 1881 Rochester, Minnesota. She went on to study at the Minneapolis School of Fine Arts. In 1915 she moved to Whidbey Island, Washington, where she married Peter Camfferman, a Dutch artist. She was a member of Seattle's Group of Twelve and also the Women Artists of Washington.

Her work is included in the permanent collection of the Seattle Art Museum and the General Services Administration.
