= Tamy Ben-Tor =

Israeli visual artist

Tamy Ben-Tor (Hebrew: תמי בן-תור; born 1975) is an Israeli visual artist.

== Biography ==
Ben-Tor is one of a number of prominent female artists inventing characters and playing them herself, her work combines performance with photography and/or video. Included in this lineage of artists are Claude Cahun, Eleanor Antin, Martha Wilson and Cindy Sherman. Her themes draw on the social observation of daily life and gender roles, but dig with more risky commentary into issues relating to Jewishness and Israel, her country of origin where she graduated from the School of Visual Theatre. Graduating then from Columbia University's MFA Program in 2006, she lives and works in New York and shows with Zach Feuer Gallery.

Ben-Tor's work belongs to a generation of artists that use absurdity and humor to comment on serious ideas. Underlying her outlandish caricatures and purposefully lowtech artifice of minimal make-up and settings, is a fusion of illusion and a stupid-smart whiplash arriving at unexpected views into the complexity of the human condition. At the same time, Ben-Tor believes herself to be ahistorical in her own thinking. When asked about feminism's role in her work at a 2006 conference on the very topic, she claimed that she "doesn't think about feminism at all." She said "It is problematic to associate myself with any ideology," and referred to feminist positions as "weak."

In October 2023, during the Gaza war, Ben-Tor published a satirical video titled "Dear Hamas..." in which she caricatures a "liberal academic" who is "on the fence about the massacre of the babies". Pro-Palestinian student groups at the Hunter College where she was an adjunct professor, have criticized the video and called for her dismissal. Ben-Tor, in agreement with the Hunter administration, has sent an apology letter explaining her position on the controversy. Ultimately, Ben-Tor was dismissed from her position at Hunter College. The college maintained that her employment was on a semester by semester basis, and that they had no course to offer her for the following semester. However, Ben-Tor claims that all courses she previously taught continued to be offered, and that teaching them was assigned to colleagues who signed the petition against her.

== Press ==
She has been profiled and reviewed by a range of major news outlets including Art Forum, The New York Times, and The New Yorker. In one such article Ken Johnson of The New York Times describes Ben-Tor as the, "George Orwell of today's video art." The critic Roberta Smith has likened her work to the similarly shapeshifting works of Cindy Sherman.

== Collections and awards ==
Tamy Ben-Tor has work in many public collections including The Pérez Art Museum Miami, The Tel Aviv Museum of Art, The Israel Museum, and The Whitney Museum of American Art.

She has won numerous awards for her work including the Foundation for Contemporary Art Grants to Artists award (2008), New York and Art Matters Foundation.
