= Theodore Haupt =

American artist (1902–1990)

- Born: Theodore Gilbert Haupt; October 11, 1902; St. Paul, Minnesota
- Died: 13 June 1990 (aged 87); Indianapolis, Indiana
- Education: Minneapolis School of Art, Académie Julian in Paris, André Lhote
- Known for: Painting, drawing, graphic design
- Movement: Cubism, Surrealism

Theodore Gilbert Haupt (1902–1990), was an American Modernist painter, sculptor and muralist who melded Cubist with Surrealist elements. As a graphic designer, he achieved recognition for his New Yorker magazine covers.

== Early life ==
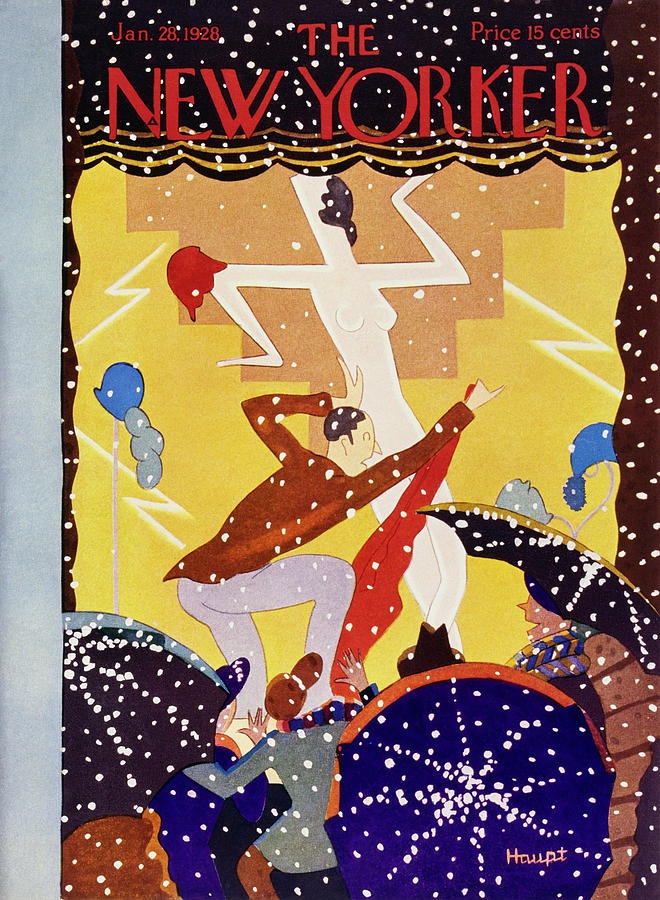
January 28, 1928 cover of The New Yorker by Haupt

Theodore Haupt was the second youngest of five children born to an Episcopalian Minister, Reverend Charles Edgar Haupt and Alexandria Dougon, in St. Paul Minnesota on October 11, 1902. Reverend Haupt's father was General Herman Haupt who supervised the railroads, built bridges for the Union Army during the Civil War and became an outspoken voice in President Lincoln's White House during that troubled time.

Haupt's early gifts for drawing and painting were noted but not encouraged by his family. Nonetheless, he persevered and was further inspired when, at age twenty-one, his paintings received highly favorable reviews in a large exhibition mounted by The Beard Gallery in Minneapolis. Haupt attended the Minneapolis School of Art, studying with Anthony Angarola, recipient of a Guggenheim Fellowship and an acclaimed Chicago modernist. A critical turning point came for Haupt in 1923, when he won a scholarship to the Académie Julian in Paris. Haupt remained in Europe for two years, studying with the sculptor and painter, André L’Hote in Paris, Vienna and Gratz.

== Graphic designer career ==
In 1927 Haupt moved to New York, renting an apartment on East 10th Street in Manhattan. For five years Haupt supported his studio art with graphic design assignments for The New Yorker, Charm and Vanity Fair magazines; his debut cover for The New Yorker being produced almost immediately in September of that first year. Between 1927 and 1933, Haupt turned out a staggering forty-five covers for The New Yorker presenting a gamut of subjects from;

- New York City at night
- a view of Park Avenue (October 26, 1929 issue), now in the collection of the Museum of the City of New York.
- art deco-style interpretations of annual events and social commentaries

== The 1930s ==
Barbara in Plume Hat 1933 Oil on Canvas, 22" X 18"

Haupt's modernist paintings were being exhibited in New York art galleries and at museums around the country. Two of his paintings were selected for The Art Institute of Chicago's 45th Annual Exhibition (October 24-December 8, 1935), Sea Beach (#91) and Shadow Lane (#92). Haupt's works were shown at a number of museums, among them The Pennsylvania Academy of Fine Art; The Minneapolis Institute of Art; and The Whitney Museum of American Art, New York.

Haupt continued turning out paintings and executing art for public spaces including work for the Whitney Museum and a mural for the Central Park Zoo, which was destroyed in a restoration of the zoo. Along with many other artists during the depression, Haupt was active in the period's government sponsored WPA Art Programs, an experience that encouraged an open-minded and experimental attitude in his art practice for the remainder of his life. Haupt recalled the sculptor Louise Nevelson's lively “rent parties” which he attended with other WPA artists including Ivan Albright and Moses Soyer.

== A new direction ==
The Duchess 1946 (Miriam Haupt) Oil on Board, 24" X 20"

In 1942, Haupt married a school teacher, Miriam Diehl. Her steady employment sustained the couple financially. Haupt and his wife purchased a house on Pleasant Road Lake Peekskill, New York in 1941 and in 1948 moved to San Miguel de Allende, an artist's community in Mexico. Haupt became increasingly engrossed in that country's cultural contrasts, an interest that expressed itself in paintings and sculptures of this period. While in Mexico the couple built a house and adopted two children, Gloria and Maricella ("Mari"). After Miriam's unfortunate early death, her pension continued to sustain the artist as the demand for illustration lessened.

Now in a financial position to walk away from the machinations of the art market, Haupt embarked upon an extended period of renewed investigation and experimentation, working his way through abstract, color-drenched, non-representational painting styles and developing a series of Surrealist-inspired canvases. Haupt later investigated chromatic vibrations and dynamic optical effects in a series of compelling Op Art canvases. His career began as a realistic portrait painter and he often returned to that subject matter, reinterpreting the process each time in light of his stylistic investigations.

== Last years ==
When his wife died in the 1960s, the artist moved to Hawaii with his children, later resettling in New York in the Westbeth Artist's Community in Greenwich Village. Returning briefly to Hawaii in 1968, he connected with a lifelong supporter, Dan Wall, at the University of Hawaii. Theodore Haupt died at the age of 87, in Indianapolis, June 13, 1990.

== Museum collections ==
Beach Scene (1937) Oil on Canvas, 30" X 42"

Haupt's works are in the permanent collections of:

- Museum of the City of New York
- The Museum of Modern Art
- The former Finch College Museum
- New York University
- University of Pennsylvania
- University of Massachusetts Amherst.
