= Tracy Krumm =

American textile artist

Tracy Krumm (born 1963) is an American textile artist, craft educator, and curator based in St. Paul, Minnesota. Krumm's work combines metalworking and crochet; crafting items such as curtains and clothing out of metals and wire.

== Early life and education ==
Krumm received a Bachelor of Fine Arts degree from the California College of the Arts in 1987 and her Masters of Fine Arts degree from Vermont College of Fine Art in 1995.

== Art career ==
Krumm is an artist and educator having exhibited, taught, and lectured extensively for over 30 years. In 2010, she curated an exhibition titled New Fibers 2010 at Eastern Michigan University where she was faculty in the fibers department. In 2014, the Ellen Noël Art Museum in Odessa, Texas showed In the Making: The Art of Tracy Krumm. Her work was included in a 2019 exhibition of contemporary fiber art curated by Erika Diamond at the Jamestown Community College’s Weeks Gallery titled Pulling a Thread. She curated an exhibition titled Pride at the Textile Center in St. Paul, Minnesota, where she is the Director for Artistic Advancement. This exhibition was to be the first in the institution's history to celebrate LGBTQ+ identity.

Tracy Krumm was awarded a $25,000 McKnight Fellowship for Visual Artists in 2015. In 2016, work won first place in the Textiles/fibers category of the Minnesota State Fair Fine Art Competition.

== See also ==
- Minneapolis College of Art and Design
