= Patricia Olson =

American graphic designer, painter, feminist artist, and educator

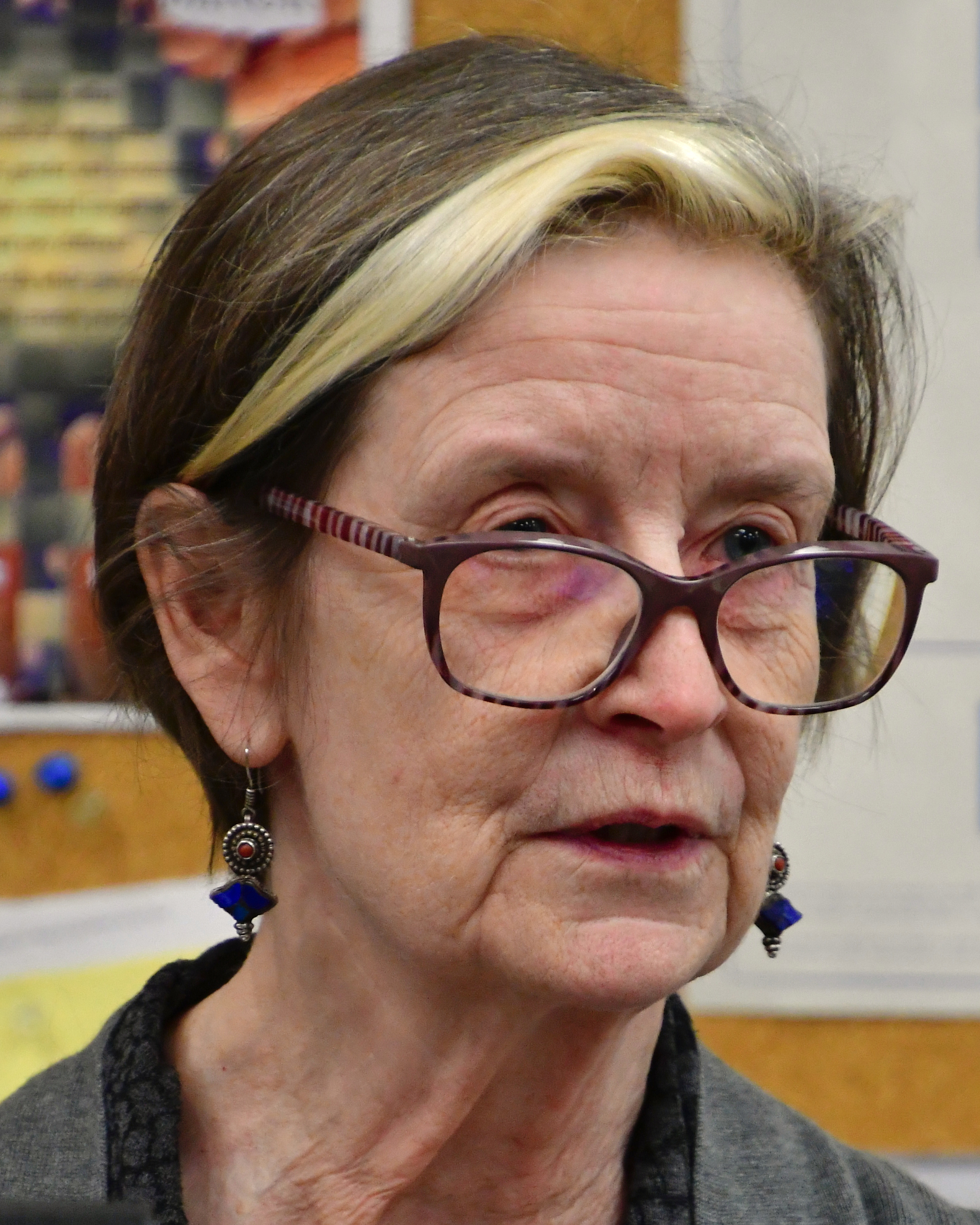
- Born: 1951 (age 74–75); Minneapolis, Minnesota
- Known for: Painting, graphic design
- Notable work: Tooth Mother, The Mysteries, Feminist Revisioning, The Catherine Portrait
- Movement: Feminist art movement Women's Art Registry of Minnesota
- Website: patriciaolsonart.com

Patricia Olson (born 1951) is an American graphic designer, painter, feminist artist, and educator whose works are categorized as figurative art. Olson was born and raised in Minneapolis, Minnesota. She earned her B.A. in studio art from Macalester College in 1973, and her M.F.A. in Visual Studies from the Minneapolis College of Art and Design in 1998. Since 1973, Olson's work has been exhibited in the United States in both group and solo exhibitions. Additionally, her works are included in permanent collections across the country.

== Art and feminism ==
=== Involvement with feminist art movements ===
The intersection of art and feminism can be seen in Olson's works of art, and also throughout other aspects of her life. In an interview she gave in 1980, she reflected on her relationship to feminism: "Right when I graduated from college, I became very interested in the feminist movement and what it meant for me personally." She is a founding member of the Women's Art Registry of Minnesota, also known as WARM: she joined the collective in 1975 as one of its youngest members, and served as chief designer for WARM journal. WARM began as a women's art collective in the 1970s. In 1976, they opened a gallery in Minneapolis, Minnesota, and registered as a nonprofit organization. "The bylaws defined WARM as a feminist organization that aimed to foster communication among professional artists in Minnesota, to promote their development and careers, and to enhance their visibility." WARM continued after the closing of the gallery in 1991, providing mentoring, networking and exhibition opportunities, and an online registry of works for women artists in the Midwest. WARM discontinued in 2021.

Olson and her colleague Elizabeth Erickson cofounded and taught the Women's Art Institute, a summer intensive studio program, from 1999 to 2021. The Women's Art Institute was housed at the Minneapolis College of Art and Design from its inception in 1999, until it moved to St. Catherine University in September 2012. When the Women's Art Institute made the move from the Minneapolis College of Art and Design to St. Catherine University, Olson took over as the new director of the program. For this work, "[t]hey were named 'Changemakers of 2009' by the Minnesota Women's Press for promoting greater self-determination, equality and justice for women and girls."

=== The Mysteries ===
Between 1996 and 1999, Olson created an ambitious series of oil paintings inspired by the ancient frescoes in the Pompeiian Villa of the Mysteries. The backgrounds of these large-scale pictures are rendered in a deep red, like the Roman frescoes on which they're based, and feature the artist herself along with various props and symbols including skeletons, masks, a ladder, a mirror, and a painting easel. Using herself as a recurring model in the paintings, Olson aimed to "claim a bond with the old mysteries" and to "paint the possibility of the emergence of the midlife woman into history as active, powerful and self-determined." She cites as inspiration for The Mysteries the book Those Women by Eleanor L. Hall.

=== The Catherine Portrait ===
In 2008, Olson was named the Sister Mona Riley Endowed Professor in the Humanities At St. Catherine University. The title was held until 2011. This honor gave her the time and resources to embark on a project requiring a deep investment of both time and energy. During this time Olson dedicated herself to The Catherine Portrait, a series of 40 16" by 16" portrait paintings of members of the St. Catherine University community, including students, faculty, and staff. The paintings are generally from the tip of the shoulders to the top of the head, and this perspective paired with the bright, clean colors of the paint create a sense of intimate proximity with the subjects. Olson conceived of the project through the interest she has always had in portraiture coupled with an idea that people in a group have something in common that comes out visually. The sampling of the community is meant to represent the zeitgeist of the community. Olson acts to reclaim the idea of a portrait, and the responsibility she as a painter of portraits has to those she paints.

=== How to be a Feminist Artist: Investigations from the Women’s Art Institute ===
After many years as instructors/directors of the Women's Art Institute, Olson and Erickson noted "emerging themes that concern contemporary women artists." In 2014, they distilled these themes into seven "über questions" and curated an exhibition (open Feb. 3–March 23, 2014) of 11 artists who had previously participated in the Women’s Art Institute and "whose work examines and illuminates these questions:

- How do I keep working in the studio, using my artistic skills and materials to express my intentions?
- How can I unlock my toolbox and truly express my authentic creative voice?
- Who is my audience and what do I want to show them? What does success look like for me?
- Where can I find a supportive community? How can I support others?
- What does it mean to have a woman’s body and make art? Is the gender question over or just beginning?
- Is feminism a conscious practice that I bring to my art?
- Do I have a responsibility to historical and contemporary women’s art? What is good, bad or beautiful? Who decides? Who cares?"

=== The Mysteries Revisited ===
Olson returned to her The Mysteries from the late 1990s to create "a contemporary reinterpretation of a woman's midlife initiation as seen in the Villa of the Mysteries murals in Pompeii." This work was shown from September 9, 2015, to October 21, 2021, at St. Catherine University's Catherine G. Murphy Gallery.

== Teaching experience ==
- 2018 - Present — Faculty Emeriti Status, St. Catherine University, St. Paul, Minnesota.
- 1997 - 2018 —Associate Professor, St. Catherine University, St. Paul, Minnesota.
- 1999 - 2021 — Adjunct Instructor, Women's Art Institute, Minneapolis College of Art and Design and St. Catherine University, Twin Cities, Minnesota.
- 1994 - 1996 — Adjunct Instructor, St. Olaf College, Northfield, Minnesota; Minneapolis College of Art and Design, Minneapolis, Minnesota; North Hennepin Community College, Brooklyn Park, Minnesota.

== Selected grants and awards ==
- 2009 – Named "Changemaker" (with Elizabeth Erickson) by Minnesota Women's Press for her work with arts and feminism through WARM and the WAI
- 2008 - 2011 – Sister Mona Riley Endowed Professor in the Humanities, St. Catherine University
- 2006 – Faculty Research and Scholarly Activities Grant, College of St. Catherine (for mounting the Buoyant Heart exhibition)
- 2000 – Faculty Travel Grant, College of St. Catherine, to present at a conference, "Ritual, Reception, Response: The Villa of the Mysteries Revisited" (University of Michigan, Ann Arbor)
- 2000 – Faculty Research Award, College of St. Catherine, support for photography and drawing materials for travel to Pompeii, Italy
- 1998 – Visual Arts Travel and Study Grant, from Jerome, General Mills, and Dayton-Hudson Foundations, for travel to Pompeii

== Selected solo and group exhibitions ==
- 2019 – A Body of Work: A Retrospective Look at Patricia Olson's Art, Catherine G. Murphy Gallery, St. Catherine University, St. Paul, Minnesota.
- 2013 – The House We Built: Feminist Art Then and Now, Katherine E. Nash Gallery, Regis Center for Art, University of Minnesota, Minneapolis, St. Paul, Minnesota.
- 2013 – Our Visible World: Paintings and Drawings, Law Warschaw Gallery, Macalester College, St. Paul, Minnesota.
- 2012 – Man Up! No Balls About It, Women's Caucus for Art, Michigan Chapter, Gallery in the Duderstadt Center, University of Michigan, Ann Arbor, Michigan.
- 2012 – Intersections: Women, Leadership and the Power of Collaboration, Minneapolis College of Art and Design, Minneapolis, Minnesota.
- 2011 – The Catherine Portrait, Catherine G. Murphy Gallery, St. Catherine University, St. Paul, Minnesota.
- 2009 – Winds of Inspiration/Winds of Change, Hillstrom Museum of Art, Gustavus Adolphus College, St. Peter, Minnesota.
- 2008 – Let Freedom Ring, Minnesota Museum of American Art, St. Paul, Minnesota.
- 2007 – The Buoyant Heart, Catherine G. Murphy Gallery, St. Catherine University, St. Paul, Minnesota.
- 2006 – WARM: 12 Artists of the Women's Art Registry of Minnesota, Weisman Art Museum, University of Minnesota, Minneapolis, Minnesota.
- 2005 – Art of the Matter, Catherine G. Murphy Gallery, St. Catherine University, St. Paul, Minnesota.
- 2004 – The Mysteries, Alice R. Rogers Gallery, St. John's University Art Center, Collegeville, Minnesota.
- 2001 – Becoming: Gabrielle Mayer and Patricia Olson, Paul Whitney Larson Art Gallery, University of Minnesota, St. Paul, Minnesota.
- 2000 – The Villa of Mysteries in Pompeii: Ancient Ritual, Modern Muse, Museum of Art, University of Michigan, Ann Arbor, Michigan.
- 1999 – The Mysteries, Alice R. Rogers Gallery, St. John's University Art Center, Collegeville, Minnesota.
- 1998 – Re-imagining Woman: Body and Mind, Kleinpell Gallery 101, University of Wisconsin-River Falls, Wisconsin.
- 1997 – Generations: 25th Anniversary Exhibition, A.I.R. Gallery, New York City, New York.
- 1995 – Double Edged Sphere: WARM's 16th Annual Juried Exhibition, Catherine G. Murphy Gallery, St. Catherine University, St. Paul, Minnesota.
- 1994 – WARM Mentor Program Exhibition, Katherine E. Nash Gallery, University of Minnesota, Minneapolis, Minnesota.
- 1993 – WARM's 14th Annual Juried Exhibition for Women Artists, MCAD Gallery, Minneapolis College of Art and Design, Minneapolis, Minnesota.
