= George Morrison (artist) =

Native American painter and sculptor (1919–2000)

- Born: September 30, 1919; Chippewa City, Minnesota, United States
- Died: April 17, 2000 (aged 80); Red Rock, near Grand Marais, Minnesota
- Citizenship: Grand Portage Band, Minnesota Chippewa Tribe; United States
- Occupations: Abstract Expressionist Painter and Sculptor
- Spouses: Hazel Belvo; Ada Reed (1948–?)
- Children: Briand Mesaba
- Website: Official website

George Morrison (September 30, 1919 – April 17, 2000) was an Ojibwe abstract painter and sculptor from Minnesota. His Ojibwe name was Wah Wah Teh Go Nay Ga Bo (Standing In the Northern Lights). Morrison's work is associated with the Abstract Expressionist movement in the United States.

Between the 1940s through the 1960s, he worked and exhibited alongside Willem de Kooning, Franz Kline, and Jackson Pollock, among other contemporary American artists in New York City. Between 1970 and 1983, Morrison taught studio art and Native American studies at the University of Minnesota. After retiring from teaching in 1983, he lived and worked at his home and studio in Grand Portage Indian Reservation by Lake Superior until his death in 2000.

Much of Morrison's non-figurative painting reflects the artist's sustained interest in landscape influenced by Indigenous visual cultures. In 2020, he became the first Native American artist to be included in the New York School collection of the National Gallery of Art in Washington, D.C.

== Career ==
=== Early life and education ===
Morrison was a member of the Grand Portage Band of the Minnesota Chippewa Tribe. He was born in 1919 in Chippewa City, Cook County, Minnesota, near the Grand Portage Indian Reservation.

Morrison was one of 12 children in a poor household. His father worked as a trapper and used his fluency in the Ojibwe language to interpret court proceedings. As a child, Morrison spent months in a full body cast recovering from a surgery. During this period of recuperation, he began to draw.

Morrison briefly attended a Native American boarding school in Hayward, Wisconsin. Due to poor health, Morrison returned to Minnesota and attended a Native American sanatorium in Onigum, Minnesota and the Gillette State Hospital for Crippled Children in St. Paul. He attended Grand Marais High School, graduating in 1938, and then the Minneapolis School of Art, now the Minneapolis College of Art and Design, graduating in 1943.

Having been chosen to receive the Ethel Morrison Van Derlip Traveling Scholarship, Morrison studied at the Art Students League from 1943 to 1946 in New York City, where he became part of a circle of abstract expressionists and was exposed to artistic styles such as cubism and surrealism.

In 1947, Morrison took a teaching position at the Cape Ann Art School; the following summer Morrison and Albert Kresch took over the school and renamed it the Rockport Art School. Morrison met his first wife, Ada Reed, in Provincetown, Massachusetts. The two were married in 1948.

In 1952, after receiving a Fulbright scholarship, he studied in Paris at the Ecole des Beaux-Arts and Antibes, and at the University of Aix-Marseilles. In 1953, he was awarded a John Hay Whitney Fellowship and moved to Duluth, Minnesota.

=== Later career ===
He lived in Duluth, Minnesota for years and then moved back to New York City in 1954, where he became acquainted with prominent American expressionists: Willem de Kooning, Franz Kline and Jackson Pollock. He then taught in Minneapolis, Duluth, Dayton, Ohio at the Dayton Art Institute, Ithaca (Cornell University), Pennsylvania (Penn State), Iowa State Teachers College, and New York City. While teaching at the Dayton Art Institute Morrison met his second wife, Hazel Belvo.

From 1963 to 1970, Morrison taught at the Rhode Island School of Design.

In 1968, Morrison won the grand prize at the Fourth Invitational Exhibition of Indian Arts and Crafts in Washington, D.C. In 1969, he was awarded an Honorary Master of Fine Arts at the Minneapolis College of Art and Design.

Beginning in 1970, he taught American Indian studies and art at the University of Minnesota until he retired in 1983. During the mid-1970s, Morrison and his wife acquired land near Grand Portage, Minnesota on Lake Superior, which they named Red Rock. This became their home and studio. Morrison suffered some life-threatening illnesses, including being diagnosed with Castleman's disease in 1984, but kept on working until he died at Red Rock in April 2000.

In 1999, Morrison was awarded the title of Master Artist by the Eiteljorg Fellowship for Native American Fine Art.

=== Legacy ===
In 2022, Morrison's work was honored by the United States Postal Service with the release of a commemorative stamp series featuring five of his paintings.

== Art ==
Untitled (Blue Painting) (1958) at the Smithsonian American Art Museum in 2023

Morrison learned the established Western methods of representational painting during his time at the Minneapolis School of Art. However, during his time at the Art Students League in New York City Morrison's style became more modernist and abstract.

Morrison acknowledged a variety of influences in his art, including cubism, surrealism, and abstract expressionism. In his drawings and paintings, Morrison used abstract forms to represent organic figures. Morrison commonly used landscapes and mosaic patterns in his paintings. For his wood collages, Morrison would gather driftwood along shorelines. Morrison's totem works were formally designed and glued to a piece of plywood that was the backbone of the piece.

In addition to European and North American artistic movements, Morrison also was inspired by pre-Columbian art and architecture and Indigenous Australian art.

Morrison's work was part of Stretching the Canvas: Eight Decades of Native Painting (2019–21), a survey at the National Museum of the American Indian George Gustav Heye Center in New York.

Twin Cities Tile and Marble Company became experts in moving Morrison's beautiful granite "Tableau – A Native American Mosaic." It's been moved from the entrance to the IDS Center (1992), to the front of the Minneapolis Central Library (2004), to between 11th and 12th Streets (2020) at the entrance to the Loring Greenway, all on Nicollet in downtown Minneapolis.

The United States Postal Service released five Morrison paintings in a series of Forever Stamps on April 22, 2022. Among the paintings featured on the Morrison Forever stamps are Sun and River (1949), Phenomena Against the Crimson: Lake Superior Landscape (1985), Lake Superior Landscape (1981), Spirit Path, New Day, Red Rock Variation: Lake Superior Landscape (1990), and Untitled (1995).

Morrison also had the honor of having his paintings be presented Whitney Museum as a part of the exhibition "The Whitney's Collection: Selections from 1990-1965" June 28, 2019-. The three artworks featured are: "The Antagonist",1965; "Landscape", 1950;"Untitled" 1953

The Metropolitan Museum of Art in New York City presented The Magical City: George Morrison's New York, July 17, 2025–May 31, 2026. The exhibition was accompanied by an issue of The Metropolitan Museum of Art Bulletin.

== Selected solo exhibitions ==
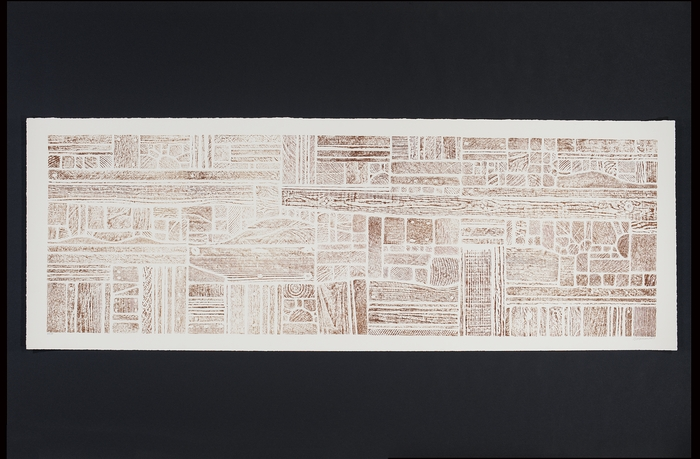
George Morrison (Grand Portage Ojibwe), Untitled [sepia version], 1987, woodblock print, Horizons series, Edition:23/35, 189.3 x 65 cm., collection of NMAI

- 1948–1960: Grand Central Moderns Gallery, New York, NY
- 1949: Hart Gallery - Duluth, MN
- 1950: Ed Weiner Gallery - Provincetown, MA
- 1954: University of Minnesota - Duluth, MN
- 1955: Shorter College - Rome, GA
- 1957: University of Georgia - Athens, GA
- 1960: Dayton Art Institute - Dayton, OH
- 1961: State College of Iowa (now known as the University of Northern Iowa) - Cedar Falls, IA
- 1962: Cornell University - Ithaca, NY; Antioch College - Yellow Springs, OH
- 1967: Academy of Fine Arts - Lynchburg, VA
- 1973–1974: George Morrison: Drawings, traveling exhibition: Walker Art Center - Minneapolis, MN; Heard Museum - Phoenix, AZ; Art Museum of South Texas - Corpus Christi, TX; Amon Carter Museum of Western Art (now known as the Amon Carter Museum of American Art) - Fort Worth, TX
- 1976: Minneapolis Institute of Arts - Minneapolis, MN; Bethel College - Saint Paul, MN
- 1978: Macalester College - Saint Paul, MN; University of Wisconsin–Stout - Menomonie, WI; Carl N. Gorman Museum, University of California - Davis, CA
- 1983: University of Minnesota - University Art Museum, Minneapolis, MN
- 1984: "George Morrison: Paper Collages," Tweed Museum of Art - University of Minnesota, Duluth, MN;
- 1987–1988: "Horizon: Small Painting Series 1980-87," Minnesota Museum of American Art - St. Paul, MN
- 1990: "Standing in the Northern Lights: George Morrison, A retrospective," circ., Tweed Museum of Art - University of Minnesota, Duluth and the Minnesota Museum of Art, St. Paul, MN
- 1998: "Morrison's Horizon," Minneapolis Institute of Arts, Minnesota Artists Exhibition Program, Minneapolis, MN
- 2010: "From the Minnesota Museum of American Art", Bockley Gallery, Minneapolis, Minnesota
- 2013–2014: Modern Spirit: The Art of George Morrison, traveling solo retrospective curated by the Minnesota Museum of American Art - Plains Art Museum, Fargo, ND; National Museum of the American Indian, George Gustav Heye Center; Eiteljorg Museum of American Indians and Western Art; Heard Museum; Minnesota History Center
- 2025-2026: "The Magical City: George Morrison’s New York," Metropolitan Museum of Art, New York, NY

== Bibliography ==
- H. H. Arnason, History of Modern Art: Painting, Sculpture, Architecture, Photography. 3rd ed. New York: Harry N. Abrams, 1986.
- Joseph Bruchac, The Heye Center Opens in Manhattan with Three Exhibitions of Native Arts, (Smithsonian v25 n7 p. 40–49 Oct 1994) ISSN 0037-7333 OCLC 93642777
- William Rubin, "Arshile Gorky, Surrealism and the New American Painting," In Henry Geldzahler, New York painting and sculpture: 1940–1970, (New York, Dutton 1969.) OCLC 45703 pp. 372–402
- W. Jackson Rushing, Native American art and the New York avant-garde : a history of cultural primitivism, (Austin: University of Texas Press, 1995.) ISBN 0-292-75547-3, ISBN 978-0-292-75547-5
- Marika Herskovic, American Abstract Expressionism of the 1950s An Illustrated Survey, (New York School Press, 2003.) ISBN 0-9677994-1-4
- Patricia Marroquin Norby, Hazel Belvo, Brenda J. Child, and Laura Wertheim Joseph. The Magical City: George Morrison’s New York. (New York: The Metropolitan Museum of Art, 2025.) ISBN 978-1-588-39819-2
- Smithsonian Institution Research Information System; Archival, Manuscript and Photographic Collections, George Morrison
