= Ben Willmore =

- Born: 17 June 1967 (age 59); Minneapolis–Saint_Paul, Minnesota
- Known for: Photography
- Notable work: Up to Speed, Photoshop Studio Techniques, Crafting the Landscape
- Movement: Photoshop
- Awards: Photoshop Hall of Fame

Ben Willmore is an American photographer, author and founder of Digital Mastery, a training and consulting firm that specializes in photography and digital imaging. He is best known for his digital imaging expertise and for writing the book Photoshop Studio Techniques.

== Career ==
Willmore, who attended the Minneapolis College of Art and Design and the University of Minnesota-Twin Cities, is a Photoshop instructor and a featured speaker at publishing conferences and events. He has contributed to MacWorld magazine and had a monthly column in Photoshop User magazine. His book, Photoshop Studio Techniques is printed in nine languages: English, French, German, Greek, Chinese, Spanish, Czech, Japanese, Polish.

In 2004, Willmore was a recipient of a Photoshop Hall of Fame Award.

Up to Speed, one of Willmore's books, was described in Rob Galbraith's blog as "perhaps the most useful book we've picked up on Photoshop in a long time ... because it painstakingly outlines what's new in CS2." About his book Adobe Photoshop CS3 Studio Techniques, Blogcritics' T. Michael Testi wrote that it "covers all of the fundamental techniques that you need to become proficient with Photoshop and it shows you how to accomplish tasks by teaching."

Willmore is known for the decade of time he spent living full-time on a 40-foot motorcoach that he used to photograph America in between speaking engagements.

He spent eight years restoring a 1963 Flxible Starliner bus which he spent a year living on full-time before purchasing a home in Clearwater, Florida. The bus has been named the Creative Cruiser and has appeared on the Extreme RVs TV show #502 "Keep on Trucking" Season 5, Episode 2

== Books ==
- Adobe Photoshop 5.0 Studio Techniques (1999, Adobe Press) (ISBN 978-1568304748)
- Adobe Photoshop 6.0 Studio Techniques (2001, Adobe Press) (ISBN 978-0201716122)
- Adobe Photoshop 7.0 Studio Techniques (2002, Adobe Press) (ISBN 978-0-321-11563-8)
- Adobe Photoshop CS Studio Techniques (2004, Adobe Press) (ISBN 978-0-321-21352-5)
- Adobe Photoshop CS2 Studio Techniques (2005, Adobe Press) (ISBN 978-0321321893)
- Adobe Photoshop CS3 Studio Techniques (2007, Adobe Press) (ISBN 978-0321510464)
- Adobe Photoshop CS4 Studio Techniques (2009, Adobe Press) (ISBN 978-0321613103)
- Adobe Photoshop CS2: Up to Speed (2005, Peachpit Press) (ISBN 978-0321330505)
- Adobe Photoshop CS3: Up to Speed (2007, Peachpit Press) (ISBN 978-0321514295)
- Adobe Photoshop CS4: Up to Speed (2008, Peachpit Press) (ISBN 978-0321580054)
- How to Wow: Photoshop for Photography (2004, Peachpit Press) (ISBN 978-0321227997)
- How to Wow: Photoshop for Photography-Second Edition (2005, Peachpit Press) (ISBN 978-0321357502)
- The PhotoshopWorld Dream Team Book (2005, Peachpit Press) (ISBN 978-0735714212)
- Crafting the Landscape Photograph with Lightroom Classic and Photoshop (2023, Rocky Nook) (ISBN 978-1681989891)
