= Zach Feuer Gallery =

Contemporary art galleries in the U.S.

Coordinates: 40°44′52.3″N 74°00′25.2″W

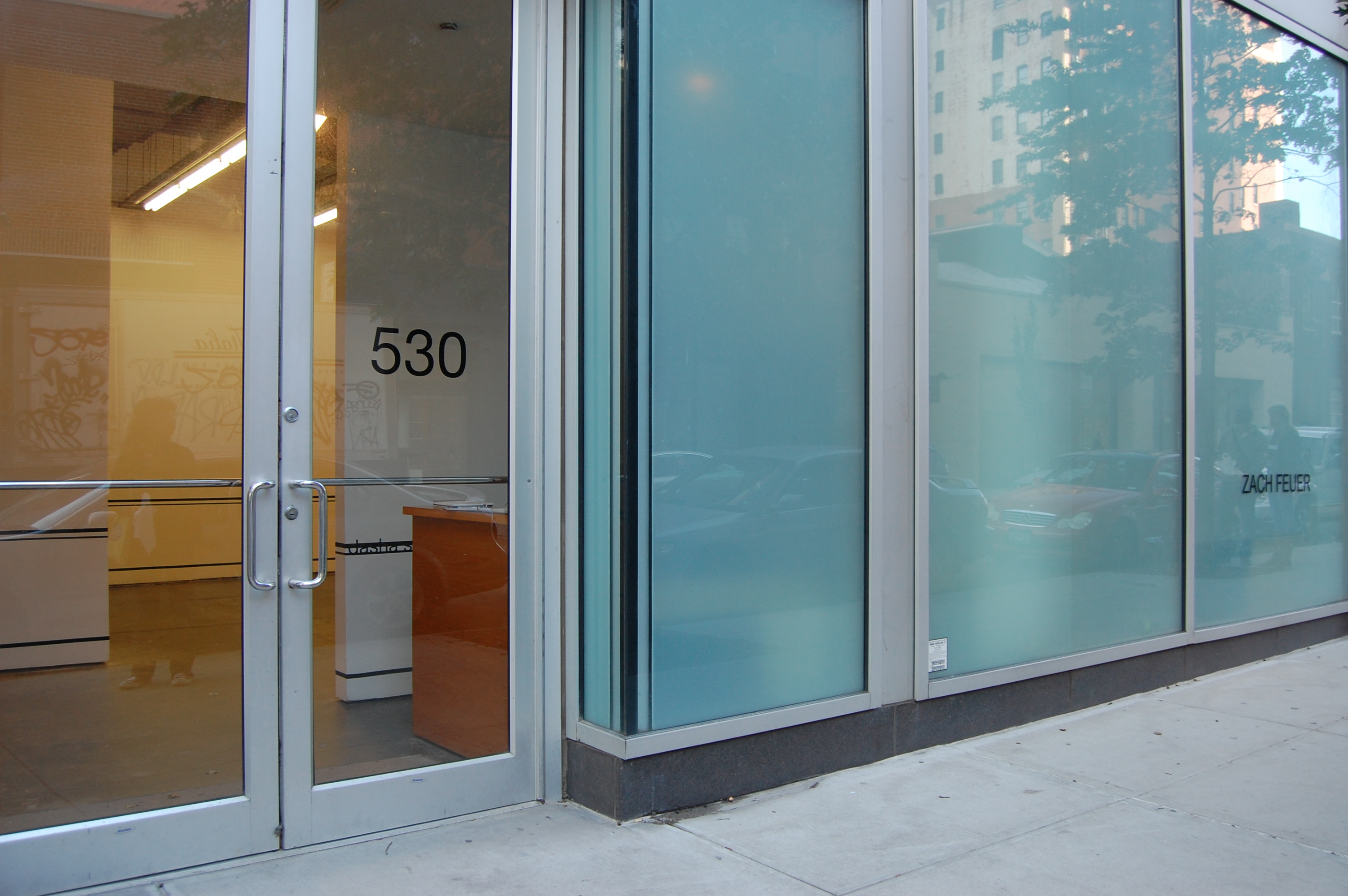
Zach Feuer Gallery in New York City

The Zach Feuer Gallery was a contemporary art gallery that operated from 2000 to 2016 in New York City; Hudson, New York; and Los Angeles.

== History ==
Zach Feuer Gallery was founded in 2000 as the LFL Gallery by Nick Lawrence, Russell LaMontagne and Zach Feuer. It was originally located on a fourth floor space on 26th Street in Chelsea, Manhattan. In 2002, the gallery moved to a first floor space on 24th Street, briefly sharing space with an art book gallery owned by one of the partners. In 2004, Zach Feuer purchased the gallery from his partners and changed the gallery name to "Zach Feuer Gallery". In 2010, the gallery moved to the Dia Art Foundation's old space on 22nd Street.

In 2015 Zach Feuer merged galleries with Joel Mesler (previously of Untitled Gallery) and relocated to two spaces on the Lower East Side on Manhattan.

Some of the artists exhibited by Zach Feuer Gallery include Mark Flood, Brad Troemel, Dasha Shishkin, Jeremy DePrez Phoebe Washburn, Nathalie Djurberg, Jon Rafman, Tamy Ben-Tor, and Dana Schutz. Zach Feuer Gallery has also presented historical exhibitions of Michel Auder and Corita Kent. During the summer, Zach Feuer Gallery presents thematic group exhibitions. Past shows include "Jew York" and "Context Message". In 2009, the gallery presented a blood drive in the gallery as a work of art by Kate Levant.

The gallery was severely damaged by flooding caused by Hurricane Sandy, with about 98% of the gallery's inventory destroyed. The Gallery rebuilt and reopened 2 months after the storm with a group exhibition.

In 2015, the gallery moved to the Lower East Side where is shared a space with Untitled/Joel Mesler gallery to become Feuer/Mesler. Originally sharing two locations on the Lower East Side, the galleries later consolidated to a single space on Orchard Street.

In 2016 Zach Feuer transferred ownership of Feuer / Mesler Gallery to Marinaro Gallery and moved full-time to Upstate NY, where he currently teaches.

== New Art Dealers Alliance ==
Zach Feuer Gallery is a co-founder of the New Art Dealers Alliance. Many of the meetings with the co-founders and original members took place at Zach Feuer's home from 2001 to 2003.

== Kantor Feuer Gallery, Los Angeles, CA ==
From 2004 to 2007 Zach Feuer Gallery partnered with Niels Kantor to open Kantor Feuer Gallery in Los Angeles. The Gallery operated out of 4,000-square-foot (370 m^{2}) space on Melrose Avenue. Some of the artists exhibited at Kantor Feuer were: Tauba Auerbach, Mark Grotjahn, Daniel Hesidence, Phoebe Washburn, Jonas Wood, and Andy Warhol.

== Retrospective Gallery, Hudson, New York ==
In 2014 Zach Feuer Gallery partnered with Joel Mesler to open Retrospective Gallery in Hudson, NY, The Gallery operates out of small storefront on Warren Street, as well as hosts off site exhibitions and a residency.

== Art loan program ==
In 2009 Zach Feuer Gallery established the Art Loan Program at the Cambridge School of Weston to allow the school community the opportunity to borrow contemporary art for an academic year.

== Art Omi ==
In 2018 Zach Feuer was appointed director of the Sculpture Park at Omi International Arts Center where he produced projects with various artists including Christopher Wool, David Shrigley, Tschabalala Self and others.
