= Deutsche Guggenheim =

Art museum

Coordinates: 52°31′00″N 13°23′28″E

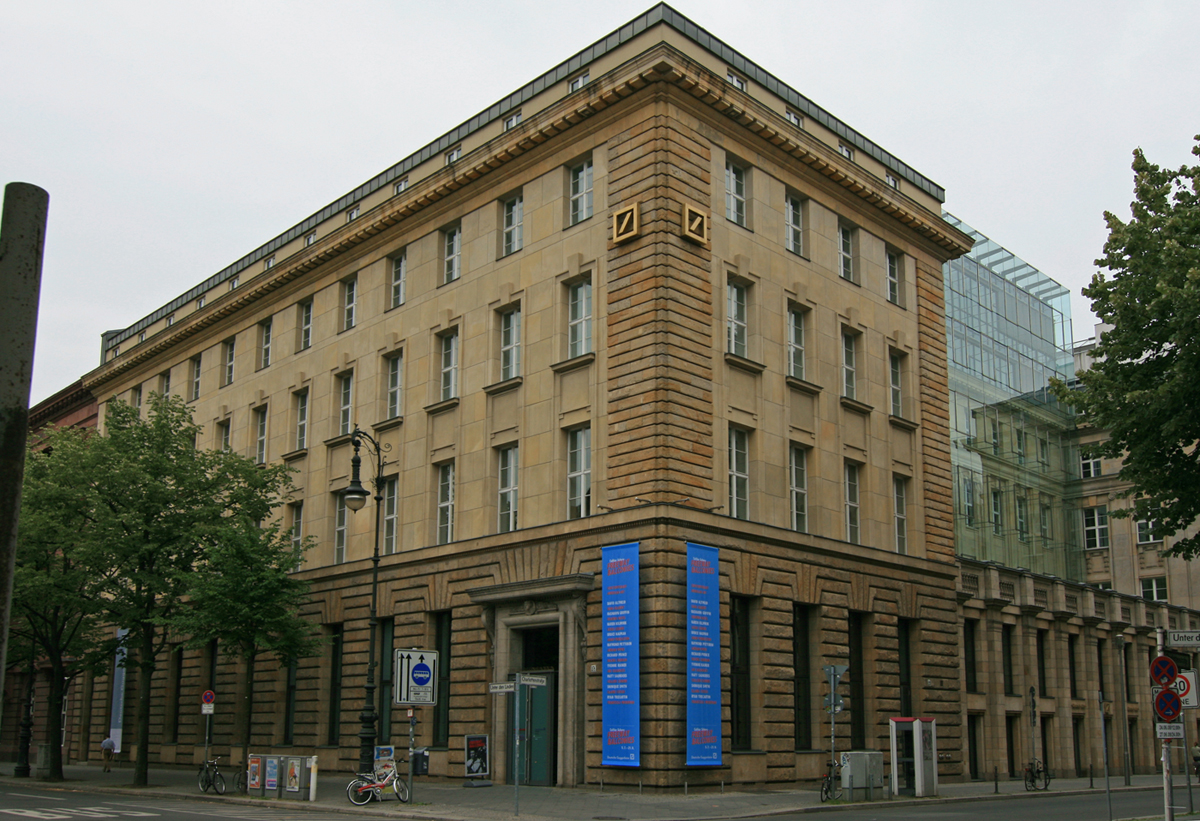
The Deutsche Guggenheim

The Deutsche Guggenheim was an art museum in Berlin, Germany, open from 1997 to 2013. It was located in the ground floor of the Deutsche Bank building on the Unter den Linden boulevard.

The museum was a collaboration between the Solomon R. Guggenheim Foundation and the Deutsche Bank, which owns the largest corporate art collection in the world. The 3,800 square feet (350 m^{2}) exhibition space was designed by Richard Gluckman, an American architect.

== History and building ==
In 1993, one year before the withdrawal of American troops from the city, the Solomon R. Guggenheim Foundation's then-director, Thomas Krens, was approached with the idea of a Berlin branch of the museum by Richard C. Holbrooke, then the American ambassador to Germany. The museum opened in November 1997, only one month after the opening of the Guggenheim Museum Bilbao.

The modest Berlin gallery occupied a corner of the ground floor of the Deutsche Bank building, a sandstone building constructed in 1920. The exhibition space consisted of a single gallery that was 50 meters long, 8 meters wide, and 6 meters high. Gluckman designed the gallery in a minimalist style.

After 15 years, Deutsche Guggenheim closed in February 2013. No reason was given for the end of the collaboration between Deutsche Bank and The Guggenheim Foundation, except to note that their contract had expired at the end of 2012. In April, Deutsche Bank re-opened the site as the Deutsche Bank KunstHalle, to show collaborative contemporary art projects with independent curators, international partner museums and cultural institutions, as well as exhibitions of works from the Deutsche Bank's art collection. Under the patronage of the Italian Ministry of Culture, in 2016 Deutsche Bank received from pptArt the Corporate Art Award for the best "Corporate Collection". The Deutsche Bank KunstHalle closed in 2018, and the art collection was moved to the "PalaisPopulaire" in the Prinzessinnenpalais.

== Exhibitions ==
Funded entirely by the Deutsche Bank, the gallery had four exhibitions each year, complemented by educational programming. Its first exhibition, in 1997, was titled Robert Delaunay: Visions of Paris. Its primary purpose, however, was to commission important new works by contemporary artists that would then enter the Guggenheim collection. At least once a year, one artist was commissioned to create a new work specifically for the exhibition space. The commissions included paintings by James Rosenquist and Jeff Koons, photos by Hiroshi Sugimoto, John Baldessari and Jeff Wall, sculptures by Rachel Whiteread and large-scale installations by Gerhard Richter, Hanne Darboven, Lawrence Weiner, Phoebe Washburn, Gabriel Orozco and Anish Kapoor.

Based on a recommendation by Deutsche Bank's Global Art Advisory Council, from 2010 to 2012, the bank each year honored a young artist who was featured in a large solo exhibition at the Deutsche Guggenheim. The museum's last exhibition, from November 2012 to February 2013 included still lives by Pablo Picasso and Paul Cézanne, landscapes by Vincent van Gogh and Claude Monet, abstract paintings by Franz Marc and Wassily Kandinsky and sculptures by Edgar Degas, Alexander Calder and Constantin Brâncuși. Titled "Visions of Modernity" and also featuring the work of Delaunay, the exhibition was intended to provide a "bookend to the Deutsche Guggenheim's very first exhibition".

== See also ==
- List of Guggenheim Museums
