= Jeremy DePrez =

American painter (born 1983)

- Born: 1983 (age 42–43); Portland, Maine, US
- Education: University of Houston (BFA); University of Houston (MFA)
- Known for: Painting

Jeremy DePrez (born 1983) is an American painter.

== Early life and education ==
DePrez was born in 1983, in Portland, Maine. He attended the University of Houston, earning a Bachelor of Fine Arts in painting in 2007 and a Master of Fine Arts in painting in 2011.

== Work ==
DePrez’s paintings have been described as "precisely imprecise" abstractions that reference everyday objects such as floor tile patterning.

Critics have noted art historical references to artists such as Alex Hay and Bridget Riley. Writer David Ebony highlighted DePrez’s irreverence toward abstract painting conventions and what he described as a "total disregard for the conventional boundaries" established by post-war art criticism, observing how DePrez merges elements of Op Art, Abstraction, and Color Field painting to create works with a "psychological dimension".

In 2015, DePez was an artist in residence at the Chinati Foundation, in Marfa, Texas.

== Collections ==
DePrez's work is held in several major public collections, including the Museum of Fine Arts, Houston, the San Antonio Museum of Art, and the Portland Museum of Art.
