= Patrick Jennings Brady =

American artist (born 1967)

Patrick Jennings Brady (born April 27, 1967 in Milwaukee, Wisconsin) is an American artist.

== Career ==
A graduate of Minneapolis College of Art and Design, Brady earned his M.F.A. in Illustration from the School of Visual Arts in 1991 and earned a certificate in Interior Design from Parsons School of Design in 2001.

His first major group show at the Hill Rose Gallery in Saint Paul Minnesota in 1988 also included work by Salvador Dalí and Matt Franzen.

In the early 1990s, after moving to New York City, Brady helped revitalize Tompkins Square Park’s “Art Around the Park” One of his more controversial shows, in 1995 was chronicled in The Journal of the Leslie/Lohman Gay Art Foundation as “Patrick Brady: Iconoclast Artist Finds a Voice at Leslie-Lohman” and also featured work by artists Robert Mapplethorpe and Keith Haring. In 1996, Brady’s work was featured in the “Deep Inside” show at the Musee d’art contemporain pornographique, in Lausanne, Switzerland. In 2000 Brady curated the “Where’s There’s Smoke…” exhibition of “Cig Art” at the South Texas Institute for the Arts.

== Cig Art ==
Brady may be best known for organizing the Cig Art benefits. of the late 1990s which helped to revive cigar box art Derived from post-Impressionist “synthetism” and American folk art “tramp art” traditions, Cig Art is the creation of painted, sculpted, and encrusted cigar boxes by visual artists.
