= Minneapolis Japanese School =

Coordinates: 44°59′38.5″N 93°0′49.8″W

- ミネアポリス日本語補習授業校

Location
- 2051 Larpenteur Avenue East; St. Paul, Ramsey County, Minnesota 55109; United States

Information
- Established: 1993; 33 years ago
- Website: www.minneapolisjapaneseschool.org

Minneapolis Japanese School (MJS; ミネアポリス日本語補習授業校 Mineaporisu Nihongo Hoshū jugyō kō) is a Japanese weekend school in the Minneapolis-St. Paul area.

It is a nonprofit organization whose mission is to teach Pre-K through 12th Grade children the Japanese language, culture and traditions in order to enrich cross-cultural skills. Classes are currently held on Saturdays at Mounds Park Academy in Maplewood, Minnesota. The mailing address is in Woodbury.

The school previously held its classes at the Minneapolis College of Art and Design in Minneapolis.

As of 2011 the school engages in fundraising during the annual Lantern Lighting Festival.

== General Information ==
The school provides four hours of instruction per week for at least forty weeks during the year, primarily in the areas of Japanese language and mathematics, in accordance with the teaching guidance summary established by the Japanese Ministry of Education. The Japanese government provides schoolbooks free of charge.

== See also ==
- Japanese language education in the United States
