= Ulrich Lamsfuß =

German artist (born 1971)

Ulrich Lamsfuß (born 1971 in Bonn, West Germany) is an artist based in Berlin.

His shows include Somebody Give the Lord a Handclap in Paris, The Raw and The Cooked in New York City, Offensive Malerei in Munich, and The Triumph of Painting at the Saatchi Gallery in London.

Lamsfuß shares the 2005 Contemporary European Painting Award with Frédérique Loutz.
