= Minnesota Museum of American Art =

Coordinates: 44.947250°N 93.089519°W

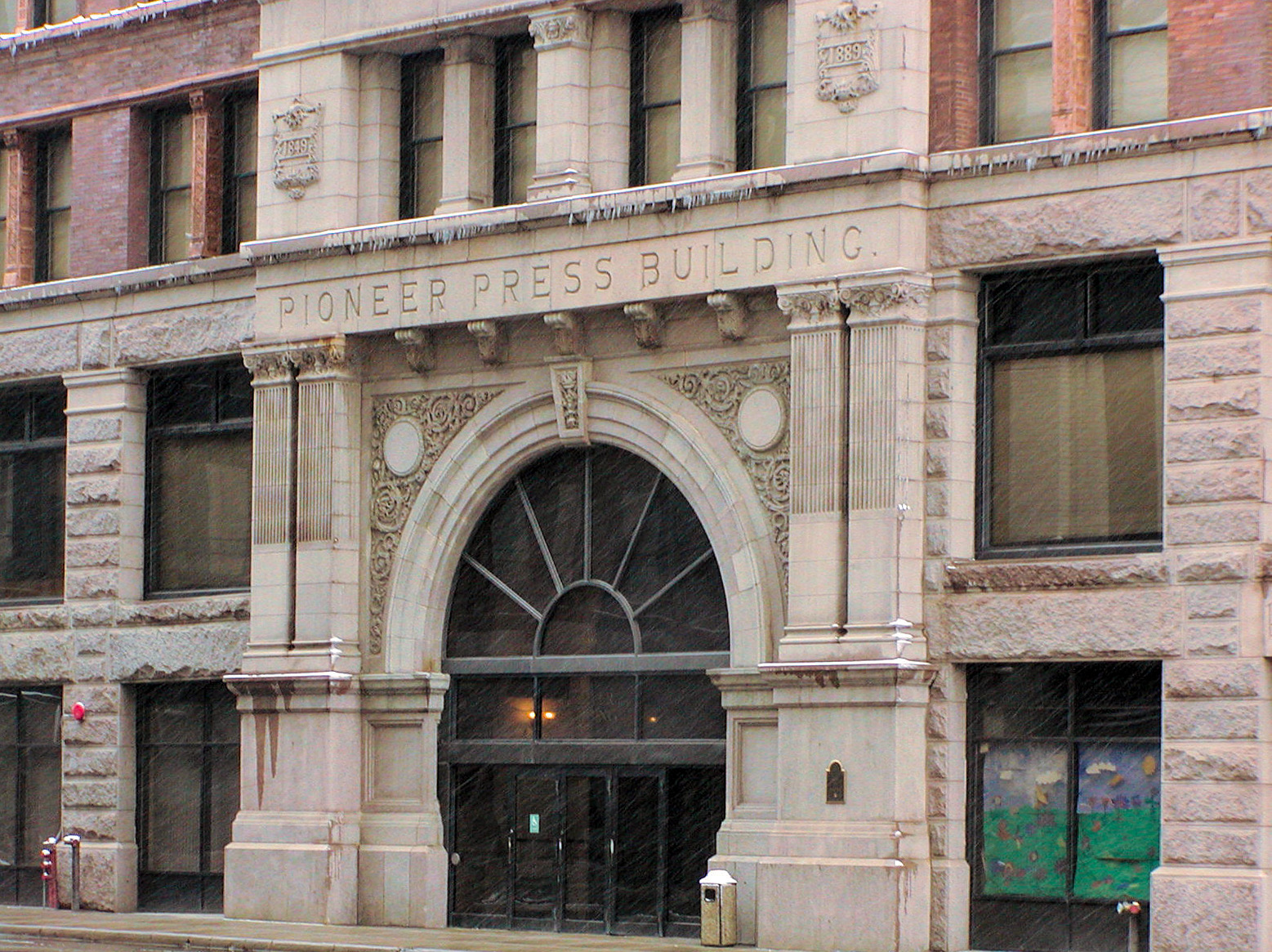
- Robert Street Entrance

- Location within Minnesota Location within the United States
- Established: 1927; 99 years ago
- Location: 350 Robert Street North; Saint Paul, Minnesota 55101
- Type: Art museum
- Director: Dr. Kate Beane
- Website: www.mmaa.org

The Minnesota Museum of American Art ("The M") is an American art museum located in the Historic Pioneer Endicott building in Saint Paul, Minnesota. The museum holds more than 5,000 artworks that showcase the unique voice of American artists from the 19th century to the present. Guided by the belief that art should reflect the constantly shifting landscape that defines the American experience, the museum desires to celebrate the work of artists from the 19th and 20th centuries as well as new voices that have emerged from communities of color, immigrants, their children and grandchildren.

== History ==
The Minnesota Museum of American Art was founded in 1894 as the St. Paul School of Fine Arts; membership at the time cost $3. In 1909 the name changed to the St. Paul Institute (or St. Paul Institute of Art and Science) and briefly became part of the forerunner to the Science Museum of Minnesota. From 1910 to 1918, artist Lee Woodward Zeigler was the director of the Saint Paul Institute.

The museum incorporated in 1927. In 1939 it was renamed the St. Paul Gallery and School of Art. The institution began collecting art in 1940 after receiving a collection of Chinese jade art pieces in a bequest. In 1962 it was known as the St. Paul Art Center. It was renamed the Minnesota Museum of Art in 1969 and changed locations to the Jemne Building, an art deco building.

The name changed again to the Minnesota Museum of American Art (MMAA) in 1992 after a failed fundraising effort which included the sale of the Jemne Building and a move to the Landmark Center.

In 2009, on the brink of bankruptcy, the MMAA galleries closed after losing its gallery space to redevelopment, though it maintained offices and traveling exhibitions. Most of the works were put in storage. In 2012 the museum announced it would reopen for limited hours in the Pioneer Building in October of that year. In December 2018 the MMAA opened an expanded permanent facility designed by Minneapolis-based architects VJAA in the Pioneer Endicott building complex.

Further expansion, including a new wing for the museum's permanent collection galleries, is scheduled to open in 2023.

== Collection ==
The collection of more than 5,000 works showcases the unique voices of American artists from the 19th century to the present, including new voices, as well as masters from the 19th and 20th centuries. The collection includes the largest institutional collection of the works of Paul Manship and George Morrison; works by American masters Thomas Hart Benton, Joan Mitchell, Romare Bearden, Ed Ruscha, and Louise Nevelson; important works of craft and folk art; and work by emerging contemporary American artists with a specific emphasis on artists from Minnesota, including Wing Young Huie, Julie Buffalohead and Warren MacKenzie.

== Services ==
The museum features rotating exhibitions on display in its gallery spaces, and during the pandemic it expanded its reach through street-facing Window Galleries and Skyway Installation. The MMAA has a dedicated learning space, the Josephine Adele Ford Center for Creativity, which includes the Wide Open Studio, a space available for drop-in making activities. Other services include Family Days, studio art classes, at-home activities, and lectures and conversations with artists. The museum also partners with artists, schools, libraries, and cultural organizations around the state to bring the MMAA into Minnesota communities. Museum admission is typically free.

== See also ==
- Science Museum of Minnesota
