= Minneapolis College of Art and Design =

Private art college in Minneapolis, Minnesota

Coordinates: 44°57′25.95″N 93°16′29.6″W

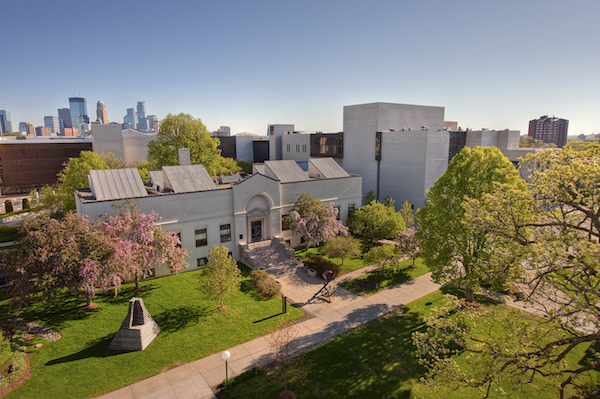
- The campus of MCAD
- Type: Private
- Established: 1886; 140 years ago
- Endowment: $53.3 million (2020)
- President: Gwendolyn Freed
- Faculty: 100
- Students: 800
- Location: Minneapolis, Minnesota, United States
- Campus: Urban, 10 acres (4 ha)
- Website: www.mcad.edu
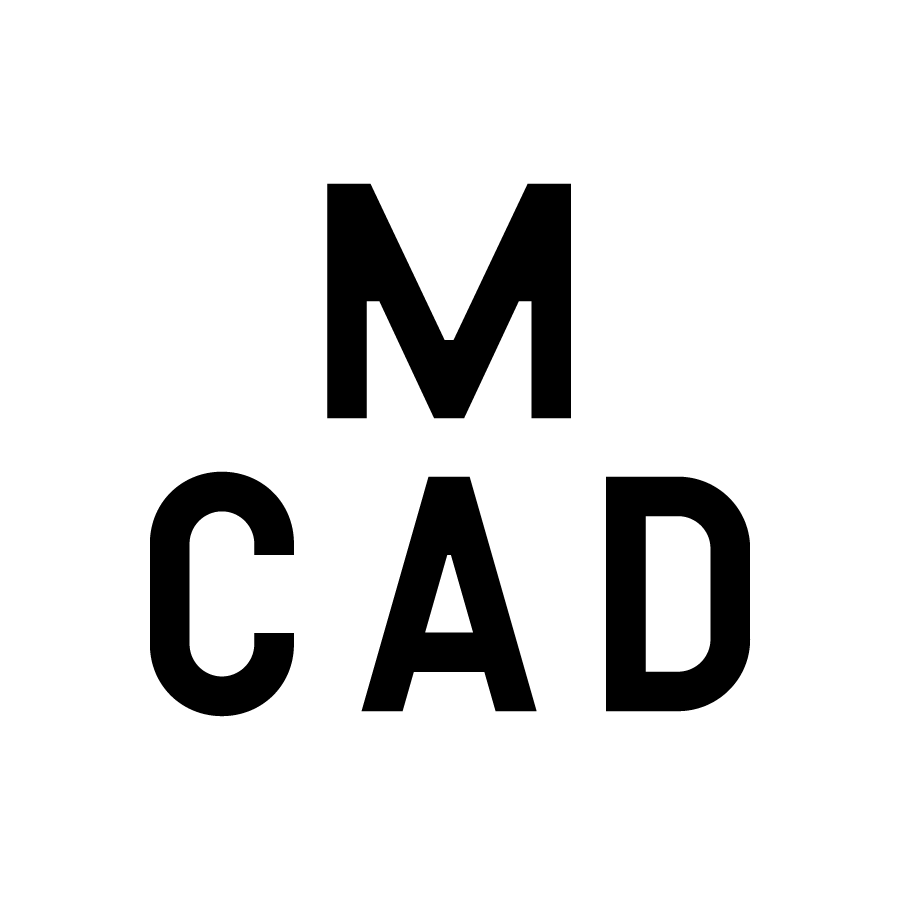

The Minneapolis College of Art and Design (MCAD) is a private college specializing in the visual arts and located in Minneapolis, Minnesota. MCAD currently enrolls approximately 800 students. MCAD is one of just a few major art schools to offer a major in comic art.

== History ==
MCAD was founded in 1886 by the trustees of the Minneapolis Society of Fine Arts and originally named the Minneapolis School of Fine Arts. Douglas Volk (1856–1935), an accomplished American portrait painter who studied in Paris with renowned French painter and sculptor Jean-Léon Gérôme (1824–1904), became the school's first president. Its inaugural class was held in a rented apartment in downtown Minneapolis and had an enrollment of 28 students, 26 of whom were women.

In December 1889, the school found a more permanent home on the top floor of the just-finished Minneapolis Public Library at 10th Street and Hennepin Avenue. In 1893, noted German-born painter and educator Robert Koehler (1850–1917) moved from New York to Minnesota to become president of the school. Over the next ten years, he developed much of the curriculum that is known today as the art education field. By the turn of the century, the school had two instructors and had instituted a summer term, in addition to night classes for people in the community. In 1910, the School of Fine Arts changed its name to the Minneapolis School of Art to reflect the new emphasis on applied arts.

In 1915, the school moved to its present location one mile south of downtown Minneapolis, and set up its classrooms and studios within the newly constructed Minneapolis Institute of Arts. The 10-acre (4 ha) site for the art museum and school was donated to the City of Minneapolis in 1911 by prominent local banker and businessman Clinton Morrison (1842–1913). It was formerly occupied by Villa Rosa, the home and estate of Morrison's parents Dorilus Morrison (1814–1897), the first mayor of Minneapolis, and Harriet Putnam Whitmore Morrison (1821–1880). The site of the Morrison's former estate is today held in the public trust under the jurisdiction of the Minneapolis Park and Recreation Board and is officially known as Dorilus Morrison Park.

In 1916, the school moved into its own nearby facilities in the new Julia Morrison Memorial Building, which was built with funds provided to the Minneapolis Society of Fine Arts by Angus Washburn Morrison (1883–1949) and his sister, Ethel Morrison Van Derlip (1876–1921), as a memorial to their mother, Julia Kellogg Washburn Morrison (1853–1883), the wife of Clinton Morrison. Designed by prominent Minneapolis architect Edwin Hawley Hewitt (1874–1939), a former Minneapolis Society of Fine Arts president, the Morrison Building featured three large painting studios with skylights, administrative offices, workshops and an auditorium.

In 1970, the School was renamed the Minneapolis College of Art and Design to reflect the broadening of its fine arts and liberal arts curricula. By this time, with enrollment of nearly 600 students, the college had outgrown its facilities, and in 1974 expanded into a building designed by Pritzker Prize–winning modernist architect Kenzo Tange (1913–2005) as part of the new "arts complex" that included the Children's Theatre Company and a major addition to the Minneapolis Institute of Arts.

On July 1, 1988, MCAD became a wholly independent institution, no longer governed by the Minneapolis Society of Fine Arts.

On October 19, 2016, the Full-time and Adjunct faculty unionized joining the Service Employees International Union Local 284.

== Academics ==
MCAD offers several degree programs: Bachelor of Fine Arts, Bachelor of Science, Master of Arts, and Master of Fine Arts.

== Campus ==
MCAD is located at 2501 Stevens Avenue, just south of downtown Minneapolis. It shares an eighteen-acre arts campus with the Minneapolis Institute of Art and the Children's Theatre Company. The MCAD campus consists of eight buildings and three acres of lawns and gardens.

MCAD offers shared, furnished student apartments for on-campus living with floor plans for two, four, or six person living across eight buildings.

The Minneapolis Japanese School, a weekend Japanese educational program designated by the Japanese Ministry of Education, previously held its classes at MCAD.

== Galleries ==
MCAD operates one main gallery space, a gallery on the concourse, an outdoor sculpture garden, and the student-run Gallery 148. The college hosts contemporary art and design exhibitions, receptions, artist talks, and other events that are free and open to the public.

== Notable alumni and faculty ==
- Kinji Akagawa: Sculptor, printmaker, and arts educator best known for sculptural constructions that also serve a practical function
- Catherine Backus: Sculptor, best known for her 1909 William J. Colvill statue inside the Minnesota State Capitol rotunda
- Henry Bannarn: Artist best known for his work during the Harlem Renaissance period
- Suzan Pitt: Animator, director of Asparagus
- Belle Baranceanu: Artist best known for her paintings and murals
- Tuesday Bassen: Designer best known for her eponymous label
- Patrick Jennings Brady: Artist best known for organizing the Cig Art benefits
- Arnold Franz Brasz: Painter, sculptor, and printmaker
- Sarina Brewer: Sculptor known for her innovative use of taxidermy-related materials and the formation of the genre of Rogue Taxidermy Art
- Emma L. Brock: Children's author and illustrator
- Esther Bubley: Photographer who specialized in expressive photos of ordinary people in everyday lives
- Margaret Gove Camfferman: Painter
- James Casebere: Contemporary artist and photographer
- Andrew Chesworth: Animator
- Adolf Dehn: Lithographer who helped define some important movements in American art, including Regionalism, Social Realism, and caricature
- Aaron Draplin: American graphic designer, entrepreneur and author
- Gregory Euclide: Contemporary artist and teacher best known for creating the album artwork for Bon Iver, winner of the Grammy for Best New Artist
- John Bernard Flannagan: One of the first practitioners of direct carving (also known as taille directe) in the United States.
- Wanda Gág: Artist, author, translator, and illustrator most noted for writing and illustrating the children's book Millions of Cats
- F. Keogh Gleason: Resident set decorator at MGM studios for over 40 years
- Samara Golden: Installation artist
- Mary GrandPré: Illustrator best known for her cover and chapter illustrations of the Harry Potter books in their U.S. editions published by Scholastic
- Theodore Haupt: Modernist painter, sculptor, and muralist who achieved recognition for his New Yorker magazine covers
- Pao Houa Her (born 1982), photographer
- Dan Jurgens: Comic book writer and artist known for his lengthy runs on the Superman titles The Adventures of Superman and Superman (vol. 2)
- Clifton Karhu: Woodblock printer based in Japan, known for his depictions of Kyoto and Kanazawa cityscapes
- Vance A. Larson: Abstract expressionist painter and portrait painter
- Tracy Krumm: Artist and educator over 30 years; Director for Artistic Advancement at Textile Center, Minneapolis
- P. Scott Makela: Graphic designer, multimedia designer, and type designer especially noted for the design of Dead History, a postmodern typeface
- Mark Mallman: Minnesota musician and composer for film
- Linus Maurer: Cartoonist, illustrator and puzzle designer
- Jin Meyerson: Artist with a disposition for large-scale painting of high detail
- Chris Monroe: Cartoonist, illustrator, and author best known for her weekly comic strip "Violet Days"
- George Morrison: Landscape painter and sculptor and part of a circle of abstract expressionists
- Aribert Munzner: German-American abstract painter
- Lisa Nankivil: Best known for her non-representational striped-format oil paintings and abstract monoprints
- Patricia Olson: Graphic designer, painter, feminist artist, and educator whose works are categorized as figurative art
- Clara Elsene Peck: Illustrator and painter known for her illustrations of women and children in the early 20th century
- Stephen E. Rivkin: Film editor and music video director
- Tania del Rio: Cartoonist working mainly in comic books who has worked for Archie Comics
- James Rosenquist: Artist and one of the protagonists in the pop-art movement
- John Howard Sanden: Portrait artist whose subjects include former president George W. Bush and First Lady Laura Bush
- Paul Shambroom: Photographer whose work explores power in its various forms
- Aaron Spangler: Sculptor and printmaker whose sculptures are carved from solid blocks of basswood and finished with coats of black gesso and graphite
- Carol Spencer
- Adrien Stoutenburg: Poet and prolific writer of juvenile literature whose poetry collection Heroes, Advise Us was the 1964 Lamont Poetry Selection
- Piotr Szyhalski: poster designer and multimedia artist
- Pete Wagner: Political cartoonist, activist, author, scholar, and caricature artist whose work has been the subject of controversy and frequent media attention
- Ben Willmore: Photographer, author, and entrepreneur best known for his Digital Imaging expertise and for writing the book Photoshop Studio Techniques

== See also ==
- List of colleges and universities in Minnesota
