= Edward Shaw =

Edward Shaw may refer to:

- Ed Shaw (activist) (1923–1995), American socialist
- Edward Shaw (bishop) (1860–1937), Bishop of Buckingham (1914–1921) and first class cricketer
- Edward Shaw (politician), New Zealand politician representing the Inangahua electorate, 1883–1884
- Edward Shaw (cricketer, born 1892) (1892–1916), English cricketer and British Army officer
- Edward Richard Shaw (1855–1903), professor and dean, New York University
- Edward S. Shaw (1853–1919), civil engineer
- Eddie Shaw (1937–2018), saxophonist
- Edward Shaw (footballer) (1864–?), Welsh footballer
- Edward O. Shaw (1920–1944), United States Marine Corps flying ace
- Edward J. Shaw, member of the Illinois House of Representatives

== See also ==
- Ed Shaw (disambiguation)
- Edward Shore (disambiguation)
