= Kinds of Kings =

Contemporary classical music composer collective

Kinds of Kings is a US-based composer collective. Founded in 2017 by composers Gemma Peacocke and Shelley Washington, all three of the collective's members are alumnae of the NYU Steinhardt Master's composition program, and studied under composers and Bang on a Can founders Julia Wolfe and Michael Gordon. The collective's members are Peacocke, Washington, and Maria Kaoutzani. Called "distinguished young creators who work in diverse styles" by The New Yorker, the organization focuses on amplifying and advocating for under-heard voices and producing immersive and inclusive work.

== Notable performances ==
The collective has had portrait concerts with the St. Louis Symphony Orchestra's Pulitzer series, New York's Metropolis Ensemble, Roulette Intermedium, and an Artist Residency with National Sawdust.

== Bouman Fellowship ==
In 2019, Kinds of Kings began its Bouman Fellowship for emerging composers. Named after computer scientist Katie Bouman, the program commissions new pieces by young composers to be premiered at major venues alongside pieces by the Kinds of Kings composers.
