= James W. Fraser =

American educationalist, pastor and academic administrator

- Occupations: Educationalist, pastor, academic administrator
- Children: 4

Academic background
- Education: University of California, Santa Barbara; New York University; Union Theological Seminary; Columbia University

James Walter Fraser is an American educationalist, pastor, and academic administrator. He is a professor of history and education and chair of the applied statistics, social science, and humanities department at the Steinhardt School of Culture, Education, and Human Development. Fraser is dean of education at the University of the People. He is a past president of the History of Education Society. Fraser was the pastor at Grace Church Federated from 1986 to 2006.

== Education ==
Fraser completed a B.A. in American History at University of California, Santa Barbara in June 1966. He earned an elementary school teaching credential in August 1968 from New York University. Fraser graduated, cum laude, in May 1970 with a M.Div. in Religious History from Union Theological Seminary. He earned a Ph.D. in the History of American Education from Columbia University in May 1975.

== Career ==
Fraser was an elementary school teacher at public school 76 in Manhattan from 1968 to 1970. He was a teaching assistant at Barnard College from 1970 to 1972. From 1972 to 1978, Fraser was an associate pastor at the Church of the Covenant.

Fraser was a research fellow at the Auburn Theological Seminary from 1974 to 1977. He was an assistant professor of education at Wellesley College from 1976 to 1978. Fraser was an assistant professor of religion and education from 1978 to 1984 at Boston University School of Theology. He was chair of the religion and social sciences department from 1979 to 1982.

At the University of Massachusetts Boston College of Public and Community Service Fraser, was an assistant and then associate professor from 1984 to 1990. He was director of advising from 1984 to 1987 and director of assessment from 1987 to 1990. Fraser was a senior associate in the John W. McCormack Institute for Public Affairs from 1984 to 1993. He was an adjunct associate professor in the school of education at University of Massachusetts Amherst from 1984 to 1993.

From 1986 to 2006, Fraser served as the pastor of Grace Church Federated, a United Church of Christ and Episcopal Church.

Fraser was professor of education and dean of educational studies and public policy at Lesley College from 1990 to 1993.

From 1993 to 2006, Fraser was a professor of history and education at Northeastern University. From 1993 to 1999, he was director of the center for innovation in urban education. From 1999 to 2004, Fraser was the founding dean of the Northeastern University School of Education.

Fraser joined the faculty at the Steinhardt School of Culture, Education, and Human Development in 2006 as a professor of history and education. He was senior vice president for programs of the Woodrow Wilson national fellowship foundation from 2008 to 2012. In 2015, he became chair of the department of applied statistics, social science, and humanities at Steinhardt.

Fraser was president of the History of Education Society from 2013 to 2014.

Fraser is dean of education at the University of the People.

== Personal life ==
Fraser is married to Kathrine Hanson and resides in New York City. He has 4 children.

== Selected works ==
- Allen, Henry Lee; Fraser, James W.; Barnes, Nancy, eds. (1979). From Common School to Magnet School: Selected Essays in the History of Boston's Schools. Trustees of the Public Library of the City of Boston. ISBN 978-0-89073-059-1.
- Fraser, James W. (1985). Pedagogue for God's Kingdom: Lyman Beecher and the Second Great Awakening. University Press of America. ISBN 978-0-8191-4905-3.
- Fraser, James W. (1988). Schooling the Preachers: The Development of Protestant Theological Education in the United States, 1740-1875. University Press of America. ISBN 978-0-8191-7161-0.
- Fraser, James W. (1989). Cooperative Ventures in Theological Education. University Press of America. ISBN 978-0-8191-7490-1.
- Fraser, James; Perry, Theresa (1993). Freedom's Plow: Teaching in the Multicultural Classroom. Routledge. ISBN 978-0-415-90699-9.
- Fraser, James W. (1999). Between Church and State: Religion and Public Education in a Multicultural America. St. Martin's Press. ISBN 978-0-312-21636-8.
- Fraser, James W. (2001). The School in the United States: A Documentary History. McGraw-Hill. ISBN 978-0-07-232448-8.
- Fraser, James W. (2002). A History of Hope: When Americans Have Dared to Dream of a Better Future. Palgrave Macmillan. ISBN 978-0-312-23904-6.
- Fraser, James W. (2007). Preparing America's Teachers: A History. Teachers College Press. ISBN 978-0-8077-4734-6.
- Fraser, James W. (2015). Teach: A Question of Teaching. Routledge. ISBN 978-1-138-88707-7.
- Fraser, James W. (2015). By the People: A History of the United States. Pearson Education. ISBN 978-0-13-136633-6.
- Fraser, James W.; Lefty, Lauren (2018). Teaching Teachers: Changing Paths and Enduring Debates. JHU Press. ISBN 978-1-4214-2635-8.
