= Shelley Washington =

American composer and performer (born 1991)

- Born: 1991 (age 34–35)
- Occupations: Composer; Musician
- Instruments: Saxophone; Flute; Clarinet; Handbells
- Member of: Wild Up; Good Looking Friends
- https://www.shelleywashington.com/

Shelley Washington (born 1991) is an American composer and performer. She is also a saxophonist, vocalist, and plays flute, clarinet, and English handbells.

== Biography ==
Washington holds a Master of Music in Composition from New York University’s Steinhardt School of Culture, Education, and Human Development and an undergraduate degree in saxophone and Masters of Education from Truman State University.

Washington's compositions have been performed by the Brooklyn Youth Chorus, Lior Willinger, NYU Orchestra, Angela Collier Reynolds, Face the Music Mika Quartet, Bang on a Can Festival Fellows, the Schiele String Quartet, and the Loud Box New Music Collective.

Washington has taught with the New York Philharmonic Very Young Composers program, and in the Young Composers and Improvisers Workshop. She has also served as the Artistic Director for the Noel Pointer Foundation, located in Brooklyn, and is a member of the Kinds of Kings Collective.

In an interview with the American Composers Forum, Washington describes her music as eclectic. “I like collage work. I feel like my brain is a definite patchwork,” she says. At the same time, she explains, "It’s harder for me to write when there’s too much musical input. I already have sensitivity issues. It’s more like conversations are hard for me. All the chatter just sounds like clucking to me. I can pick up on drums and rhythms because they’re consistent. “Swept away” is a very good way of putting it because I don’t often get to decide where my mind is going."

Washington is a member of the music collective Wild Up, who was nominated in 2020 for a Grammy in the category of Best Chamber Music/Small Ensemble Performance. In 2023, Wild Up's NPR Tiny Desk Concert premiered.
