= Ed Shaw =

Ed Shaw may refer to:

- Ed Shaw (activist) (1923–1995), American socialist and member of the Socialist Workers Party
- Ed Shaw (American football) (1895–1964), American football player

== See also ==
- Edward Shaw (disambiguation)
