= Steinhardt School of Culture, Education, and Human Development =

School of education at New York University

Coordinates: 40.72988°N 73.99610°W

New York University Steinhardt School of Culture, Education, and Human Development
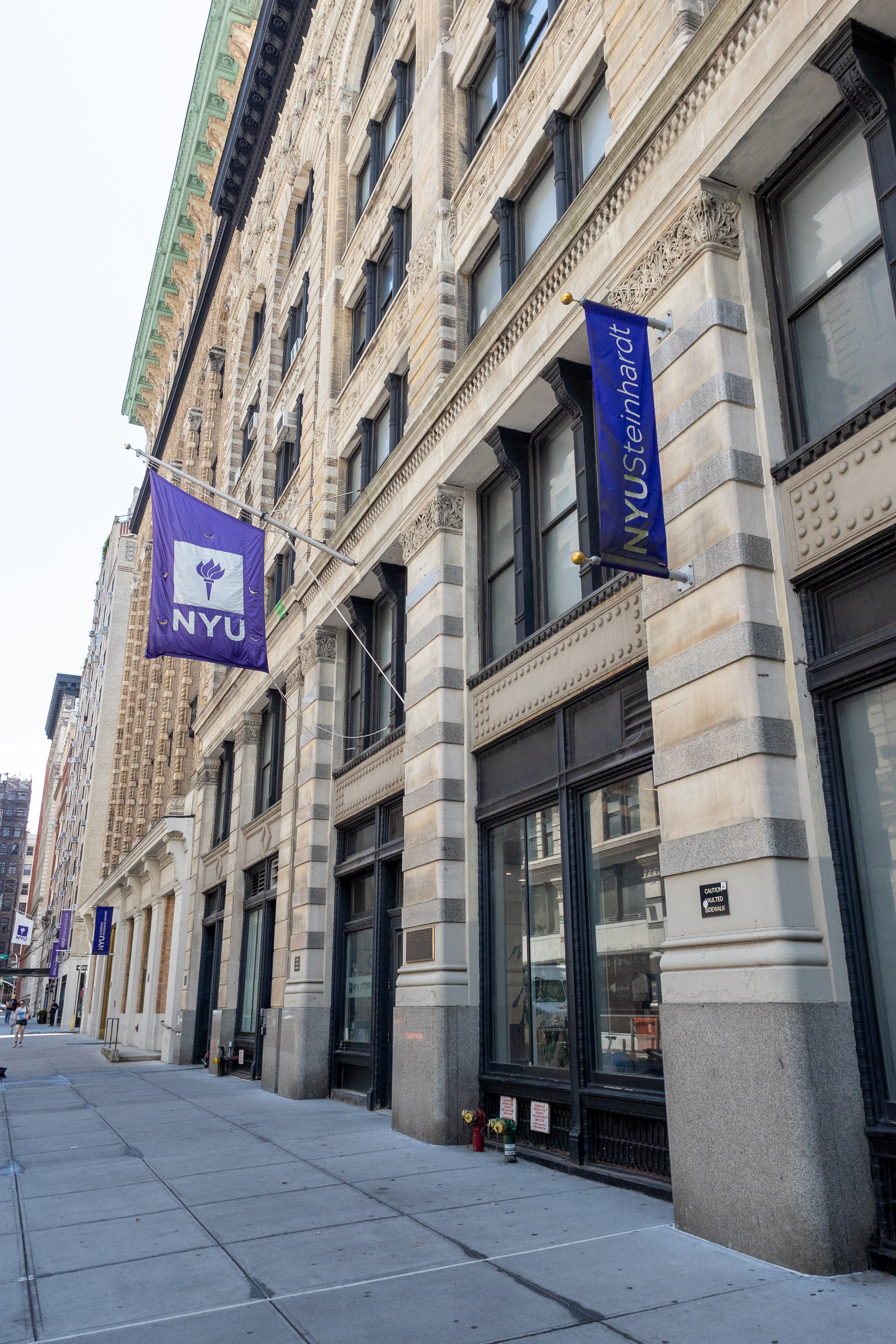
- Type: Private education school
- Established: 1890
- Parent institution: New York University
- Academic staff: 284
- Undergraduates: 3,024
- Postgraduates: 3,297
- Location: New York City, New York, U.S.
- Dean: Kristie Patten
- Website: steinhardt.nyu.edu

The New York University Steinhardt School of Culture, Education, and Human Development (branded as NYU Steinhardt) is the school of education at New York University. The school was founded as the School of Pedagogy in 1890.

Located on NYU's founding campus in Greenwich Village, the Steinhardt School offers bachelor's, master's, advanced certificate, and doctoral programs in the fields of applied psychology, art, education, health, media, and music.

== History ==
Founded in 1890 as the School of Pedagogy, it was the first of its kind in the United States. The School in its inception had four departments: Institutes of Education, History of Education and Ethics, Experimental and Physiological Psychology, and Descriptive Psychology.

The School of Pedagogy was one of very few graduate schools in the United States to accept women as students and grant them degrees; by 1900, the NYU School of Pedagogy had granted doctorates to 18 women, while only 3 other doctorates in education had been conferred to US women to that point. This put the School of Pedagogy in an important position as it was "almost the only [institution] to give women a doctorate in the highly feminized field of education." As an article in the History of Education Quarterly put it,

Women schoolteachers flocked to New York University's School of Pedagogy, because, as graduates of normal colleges, they were prohibited from entering its Graduate School. Because the School of Pedagogy was so feminized, its administration organized a Woman's Advisory Council of wealthy New Yorkers who covered the School's annual deficits for many years.

In 1921, a newly appointed dean—John W. Withers—proposed the school adopt a new name, the School of Education; Withers also oversaw the school's purchase of land on and movement to Washington Square. The Education Building on Washington Square opened in 1930 and still serves as the School's home today. Enrollment increased significantly, from 141 students in 1920 to 7,493 students in 1930 (of these, 5,449 were undergraduates and 1,544 were graduate students).

The School added areas of study related to education (music education, art education, physical education, etc.), which then expanded to broader fields. (The 1942 Education Violet yearbook lists graduates from departments including business education, industrial art, and nursing education, among many others; and a list of doctoral dissertations from 1890 to 1970 catalogues student writing on subjects ranging from safety education and accident prevention, to vocational rehabilitation, to communications.) By the 1970s, the School housed a range of academic fields beyond education, and as Dean Daniel E. Griffiths introduced 39 new programs to the school, he also oversaw its 1974 renaming to the School of Education, Health, Nursing, and Arts Professions (SEHNAP).

After reverting to the prior School of Education name in 1994, the School received a US$10 million donation from Michael and Judy Steinhardt in 2001 and added the family's name to become the Steinhardt School of Education; the Steinhardts gave another $10 million gift in 2006. In 2007, the school was renamed the Steinhardt School of Culture, Education, and Human Development to reflect the diversity of its academic programs.

== Academics ==
As of the Spring 2026 semester, NYU Steinhardt enrolls roughly 6,321 students from about 85 countries, consisting of approximately 3,024 undergraduates, 2,820 master's and advanced certificate students, 271 PhD students, and 390 professional doctorate (EdD, OTD, DMA, DPT) students. Nearly two-thirds are people of color and 27% are international students.

Steinhardt has been ranked among the top 10 of the US News & World Report Best Graduate Schools of Education every year since 2019, reaching its highest ranking at #6 in 2026.

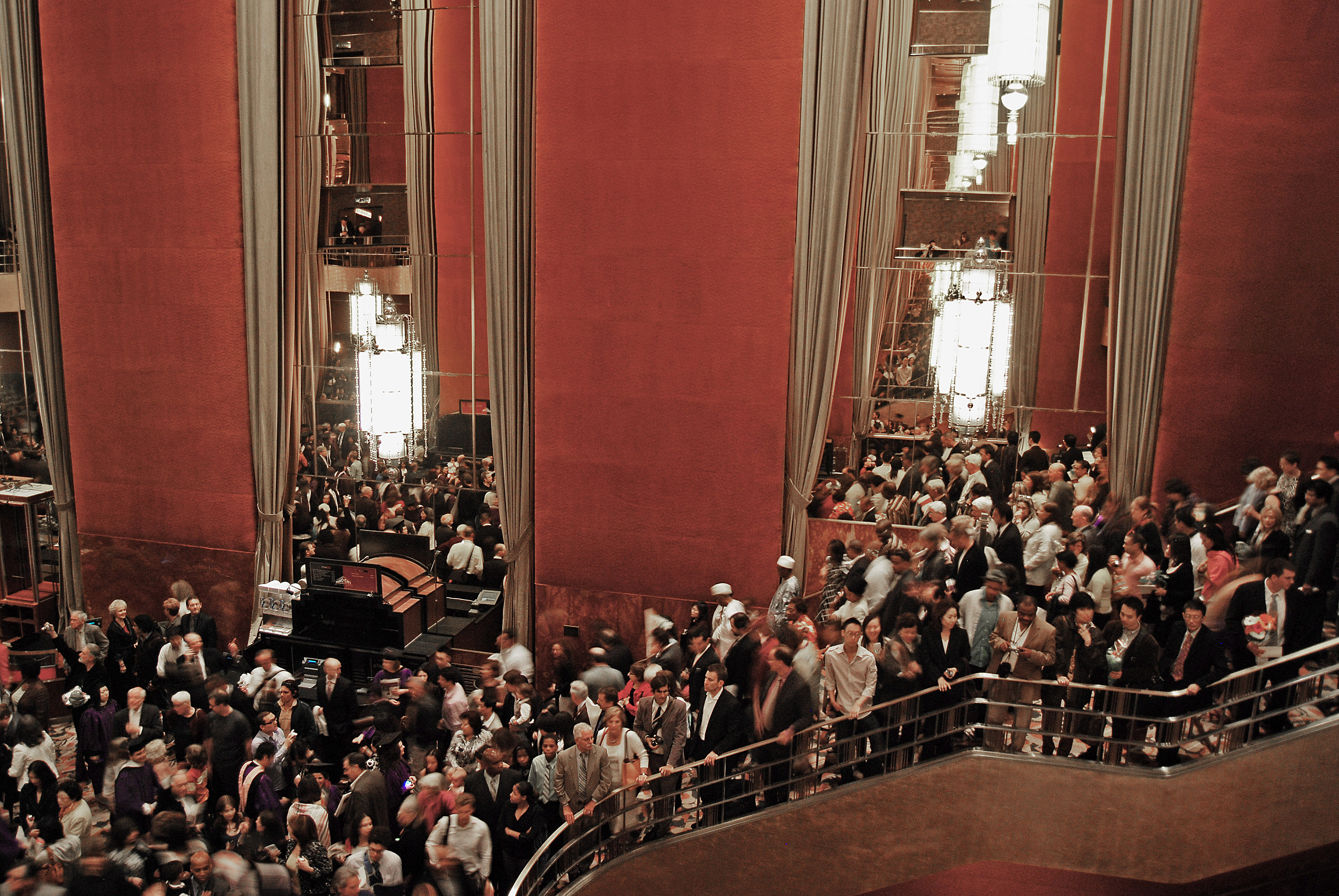
Steinhardt School graduation at Radio City Music Hall in 2008

=== Academic departments ===
The school employs 284 full-time faculty in 11 academic departments, offering more than 195 programs and degrees.

==== Administration, Leadership, and Technology ====
Programs in Educational Leadership, Educational Communication and Technology, and Higher and Postsecondary Education offer master's and doctoral degrees.

==== Applied Psychology ====
Offerings include bachelor's degrees in Applied Psychology and Global Public Health / Applied Psychology; master's degrees in Counseling for Mental Health and Wellness (on-campus and online); and doctoral degrees in Clinical/Counseling Psychology, Developmental Psychology, and Psychology and Social Intervention. The department was founded in 1989 and now includes research labs studying trauma, suicide prevention, infant neurodevelopment, self-regulation, and more.

==== Applied Statistics, Social Science, and Humanities ====
The department offers graduate and undergraduate degrees in Applied Statistics and Computational Social Science, Education and Social Policy, Education Studies, International Education, and Sociology of Education, and minors in Peace and Conflict Studies as well as Global and Urban Education Studies.

==== Art and Art Professions ====
The Art and Art Professions department has BFAs and MFAs in studio art, as well as master's degrees in Art Education, Art Therapy, Costume Studies, and Visual Arts Administration. The School of Pedagogy offered a course in the Teaching of Art as early as 1911. Facilities include studio space for painting, sculpture, ceramics, photography, mixed media, and digital art.

==== Communicative Sciences and Disorders ====
Programs include undergraduate bachelor's degrees and a minor; online and on campus master's degrees; and a PhD. The department provides graduate training and clinical services at the NYU Speech-Language-Hearing Clinic.

==== Media, Culture, and Communication ====
The Department of Media, Culture, and Communication offers undergraduate, master's, and doctoral programs, including a minor in Disability Studies and a dual degree (MA/MSc) with the London School of Economics established in 2025. Established by Neil Postman in 1971 as the NYU graduate program in Media Ecology, it was an outgrowth of the School of Education's Department of Communications in Education.

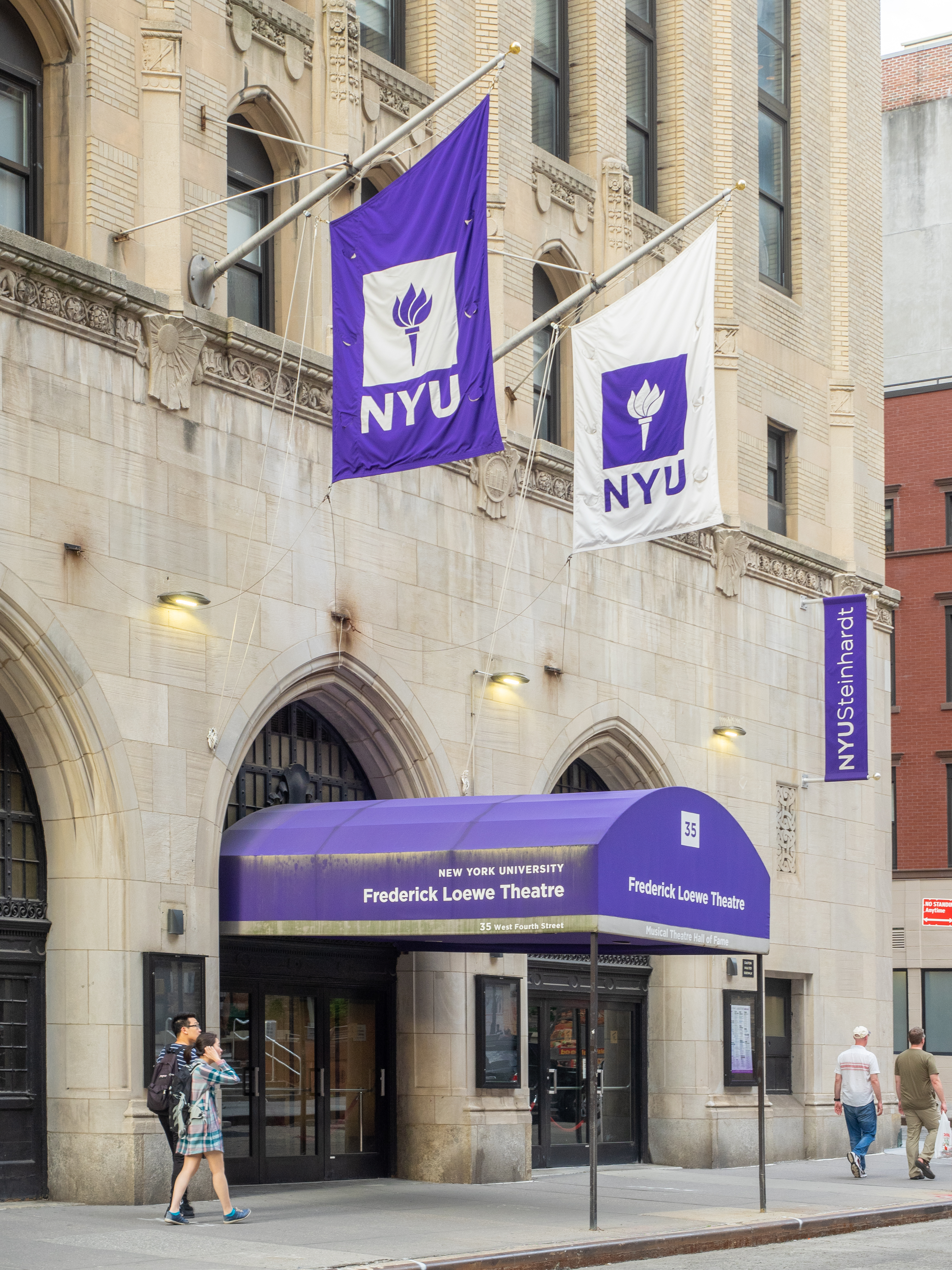
Frederick Loewe Theatre, operated by Steinhardt

==== Music and Performing Arts Professions ====
Undergraduate, master's, and doctoral degrees are available within a variety of programs:

- Performance: Brass Studies, Jazz Studies, Percussion Studies, Piano Studies, String Studies, Vocal Performance, Woodwind Studies
- Business and Administration: Music Business, Performing Arts Administration
- Performing Arts Education and Therapy: Dance Education, Drama Therapy, Educational Theatre, Music Education, Music Therapy
- Composition and Technology: Concert Composition, Music Technology, Screen Scoring, Songwriting

In 1908, the School of Pedagogy added a single Teaching Music course, with a nine-course Department of Music Teaching established in 1913. Though these courses and departments were dissolved as attendance waned during the First World War, 1925 saw the reestablishment of a music department within the School of Education.

In 1968, the New York College of Music, which was an American conservatory of music originally founded in 1878 and located in Manhattan, closed and merged with NYU, leading to the music department of the School of Education to serve both in its original capacity and as the spiritual continuation of the New York College of Music.

==== Nutrition and Food Studies ====
The department offers undergraduate, master's, and doctoral degree programs in Nutrition and Dietetics and Food Studies, as well as minors in both, alongside a teaching kitchen (the NYU Food Lab) and a teaching farm (the NYU Urban Farm Lab).

==== Occupational Therapy ====
Graduate programs in occupational therapy include entry-level, professional, and post-professional degrees, as well as a hybrid OTD option for practicing occupational therapists. The School of Education began offering classes to educate occupational therapists in 1940 and, in 1973, established the world's first doctor of philosophy program in occupational therapy.

==== Physical Therapy ====
The department includes a post-professional MA in pathokinesiology as well as a range of doctoral degrees and an advanced certificate in the study and practice of physical therapy. The School of Education first offered a bachelor's degree in physical therapy in 1927, with senior year education conducted in collaboration with the Hospital for the Ruptured and Crippled (now known as the Hospital for Special Surgery).

==== Teaching and Learning ====
Undergraduate, graduate, and doctoral programs are available in the below areas of study, with initial and professional certification options and some hybrid offerings:

- Bilingual Education
- Childhood Education
- Computer Science Education
- Early Childhood Education
- English Education
- Environmental Conservation Education
- Literacy Education
- Math Education
- Science Education
- Social Studies Education
- Special Education
- Teaching English to Speakers of Other Languages (TESOL)
- World Language Education

The department is home to projects and centers including the Constantine Georgiou Library and Resource Center for Children and Literature, the Project for Developing Chinese Language Teachers, an Office of School and Community Partnerships, the Multilingual Learners Think Tank, Practitioner Action Research, and more.

=== Online and hybrid degrees ===
Online and hybrid degrees include:

- Doctor of Occupational Therapy for Practicing Therapists
- EdD in Leadership and Innovation
- MA in Counseling for Mental Health and Wellness: accredited through the Masters in Psychology and Counseling Accreditation Council (MPCAC)
- MAT in Inclusive Childhood Education
- MAT in Secondary Education
- MS in Communicative Sciences and Disorders: accredited by the American Speech-Language-Hearing Association's (ASHA) Council on Academic Accreditation (CAA)

=== Former fields of study ===
- Global Public Health: The School of Pedagogy added a course on school hygiene in 1912. The School of Education added classes in hygiene and teaching health in 1931, with courses in the Department of Physical Education and Health including public health nursing by 1940. SEHNAP's Department of Health Studies included public health, disability studies, and human sexuality and offered courses on community health problems, environmental health, and world health crises. By 2012, Steinhardt had a bachelor's, master's, and PhD in public health available, which migrated to NYU's School of Global Public Health by 2016.
- Nursing: Early courses in 1923 ranged from Education in Health and Education in Accident Prevention to courses in the Physical Education Department. In September 2005, NYU's Division of Nursing moved from the Steinhardt School to form the College of Nursing (now New York University Rory Meyers College of Nursing) within the College of Dentistry.

== Research centers and institutes ==
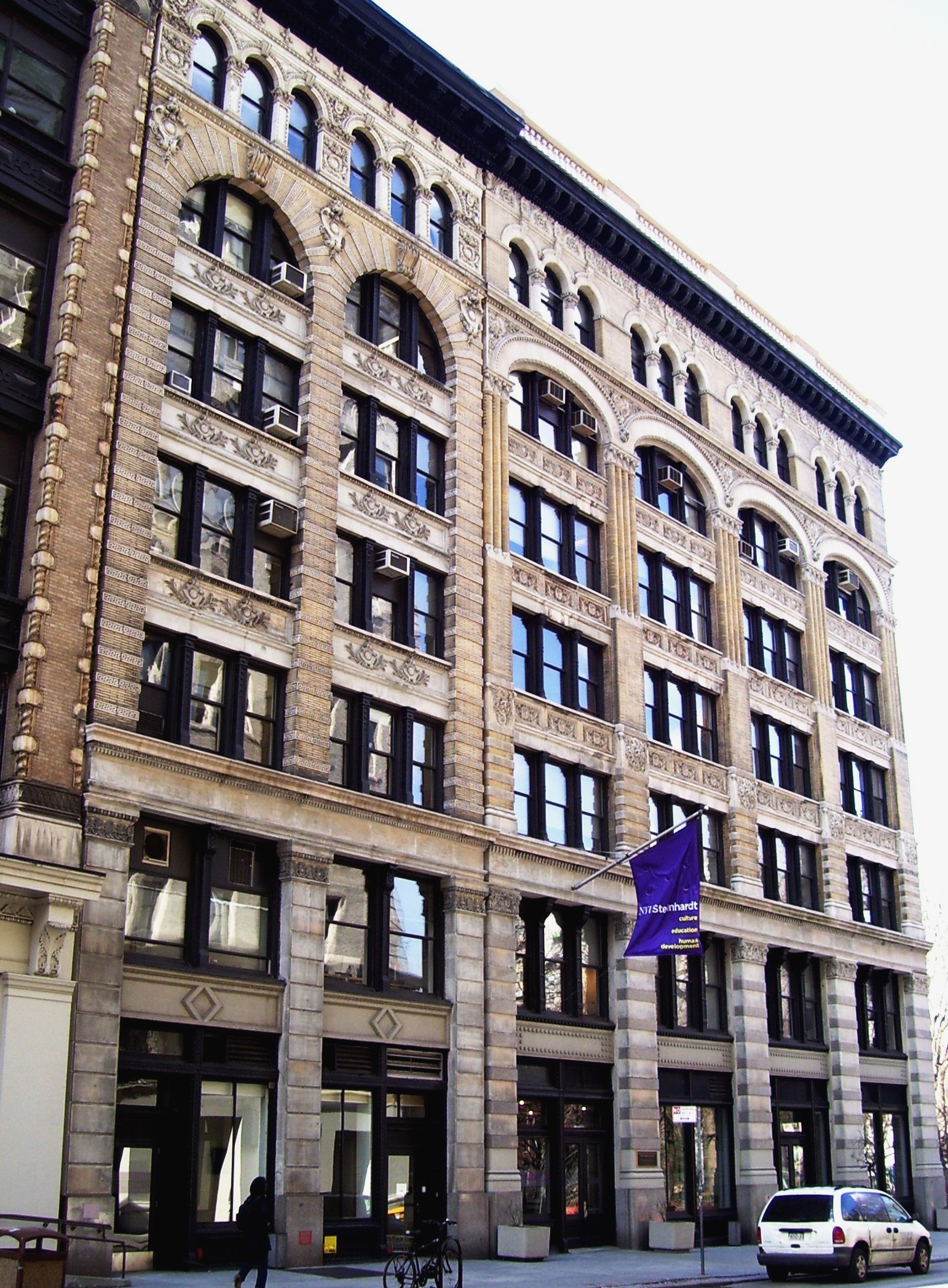
The Press Building also serves a role in housing the Steinhardt School of Culture

=== Current centers and institutes ===
Steinhardt research centers and other initiatives involve internal and external scholars, practitioners, researchers, and students.

==== Center of Health and Rehabilitation Research (CoHRR) ====
The Center of Health and Rehabilitation Research brings together scholars at Steinhardt who investigate health in all aspects: mental, physical, cognitive, communicative, nutritive, and more. CoHRR collaborates with researchers from other Steinhardt centers, NYU Langone Health, Tandon School, Courant Institute, and the NYU Center for Neural Science.

==== Center for Practice and Research at the Intersection of Information, Society, and Methodology (PRIISM) ====
The Center for Practice and Research at the Intersection of Information, Society, and Methodology supports researchers in collecting data, building inferential models and predictive algorithms, and communicating findings in impactful and socially responsible ways. Initiatives include the PRIISM Seminar Series and research fellowships. PRIISM is affiliated with Steinhardt's Department of Applied Statistics, Social Science, and Humanities.

==== Child and Family Policy Center ====
The Child and Family Policy Center works to bring field knowledge about how to promote children's healthy development and school success to the forefront of policymaking, program design, and practice.

==== Consortium for Research and Evaluation of Advanced Technologies in Education (CREATE) ====
The Consortium for Research and Evaluation of Advanced Technologies in Education includes researchers who support and explore the design and evaluation of advanced digital technologies for learning. Affiliated researchers' projects, for example, have utilized virtual reality for learning and examined how Shakespeare can help with veteran's PTSD.

==== Institute of Human Development and Social Change (IHDSC) ====
The Institute of Human Development and Social Change is an intellectual community focused on issues related to poverty and inequality, education and child development, health and wellbeing, and social policy in local, national, and global contexts. A joint initiative of Steinhardt, Wagner School of Public Service, College of Arts and Science, School of Professional Studies, and the NYU Office of the Provost, IHDSC comprises over 100 faculty and hundreds of students and staff.

Multiple other projects are housed within or partnered with IHDSC, including:

- ARCADIA for Suicide Prevention: research lab founded that takes a developmentally-informed, population-health approach to adolescent suicide
- Global TIES for Children: a global research center founded by Lawrence Aber and Hirokazu Yoshikawa in 2014 to advance science to inform programs and policies that promote children's holistic learning and development
- PATH Program: a New York City Public Schools (NYCPS) Specialized Program that serves students using a culturally responsive, trauma-informed, healing-centered approach
- SAFE Spaces: in partnership with the NYC Administration for Children's Services (ACS), uses evidence-based principles to provide training and coaching support for frontline staff working in ACS placement facilities

==== Metropolitan Center for Research on Equity and Transformation of Schools (Metro Center) ====
Founded in 1978 as the School's first research center, Metropolitan Center for Research on Equity and Transformation of Schools is a university-based center providing research and professional learning services that support equity-focused, evidence-based innovations in educational research and programming.

Metro Center supports other projects and initiatives, including:

- Center for Policy, Research, and Evaluation (PRE): conducts applied research and evaluation studies focused on promoting positive educational outcomes for youth
- Education Justice Research and Organizing Collaborative (EJ-ROC): provides research, data, policy, and strategic organizing support for the education justice movement
- Innovations in Equity and Systemic Change (IESC) (previously TAC-D): provides professional development, technical assistance, and consultancy to educational institutions in general and special education
- Liberty Partnerships Program: offers students college and career readiness through an individualized approach
- Nest Support Project: provides training, professional development, and on-site consultation for teachers, therapists, and administrators who work with autistic learners; in 2021, began partnership with NYCPS and Hunter College's School of Education, creating the ASD Nest program which, as of 2026, serves 2,215 students across 91 New York City schools

==== Music and Audio Research Laboratory (MARL) ====
The Music and Audio Research Laboratory focuses on understanding and modeling sound processing, innovating the analysis, organization and retrieval of acoustic data, and advancing applications in health, accessibility, creativity, and education.

==== Nordoff-Robbins Center for Music Therapy ====
The Nordoff-Robbins Center provides individual music therapy, group music therapy sessions, and music instruction (including group classes) for people of all ages. The center also conducts research on the creative and developmental processes of music therapy, as well as offers training and resources for current and prospective music therapists.

Program for Inclusion in Neurodiversity Education (PINE)

The Program for Inclusion in Neurodiversity Education works with educators, community organizations, and caregivers to integrate neurodiversity-affirming practices and increase accessibility for children.

==== Research Alliance for New York City Schools (Research Alliance) ====
Founded in 2008, the Research Alliance for New York City Schools conducts rigorous studies on topics that matter to New York City's public schools. It maintains a unique archive of longitudinal data on city schools and communities and advances educational equity by providing non-partisan evidence about policies and practices that promote student development and academic success.

==== Steinhardt Institute for Higher Education Policy (SIHEP) ====
The Steinhardt Institute for Higher Education Policy defines and assesses challenges facing colleges and universities.

==== Wallerstein Collaborative for Urban Environmental Education ====
The Wallerstein Collaborative for Urban Environmental Education and Sustainability was established in 2000 to promote environmental literacy and sustainability by working with educators in K-12 classroom settings, graduate students, and faculty in colleges and universities.

=== Former centers and institutes ===
- Center for Health, Identity, Behavior, and Prevention Studies (CHIBPS), founded by Perry N. Halkitis and now housed at Rutgers University
- Center for Research on Culture, Development, and Education (CHREO)
- Institute for Education and Social Policy (IESP)
- The Reading Recovery Program Northeast Regional Site

== Deans ==
- Jerome Allen (1890–1894)
- Edward R. Shaw (1890–1901)
- Thomas M. Balliet (1904–1919)
- Marshall S. Brown (1919–1921), acting dean
- John W. Withers (1921–1939)
- Enoch George Payne (1939–1945)
- Ernest O. Melby (1945–1956)
- George D. Stoddard (1956–1960)
- Walter A. Anderson (1960–1964)
- Daniel E. Griffiths (1965–1983)
- Robert A. Burnham (1983–1989)
- Ann Marcus (1989–2003)
- Mary Brabeck (2003–2014)
- Dominic Brewer (2014–2019)
- Jack H. Knott (2020–2026)
- Kristie Patten (2026–present)

== Notable alumni ==
- A Great Big World, singer-songwriter duo consisting of members Ian Axel and Chad King
- Rachel Griffin Accurso, YouTuber and educator known online as Ms. Rachel
- Sal Albanese, politician
- Marv Albert, sportscaster
- Blake Allen, composer and musician
- Gloria Allred, civil rights lawyer
- Wilfred Conwell Bain, music educator and administrator
- Joy Bauer, nutritionist
- Romare Bearden, artist
- Ib Benoh, artist
- Rose Levy Beranbaum, baker, cookbook author, and blogger
- Elmer Bernstein, conductor and film score composer
- Alessandra Biaggi, politician and New York State Senator
- Ross Bleckner, artist
- Judy Blume, author
- Carol Bove, artist
- Rustica Carpio, actress, writer, and scholar
- Herbert Chilstrom, religious leader and first Presiding Bishop of the Evangelical Lutheran Church in America
- Cy Coleman, composer (as New York College of Music)
- Betty Comden, lyricist, playwright, and screenwriter
- Adelaide Hawley Cumming, vaudeville performer, radio host, and living trademark "Betty Crocker"
- C. C. DeVille, guitarist
- Stefanie DeLeo, author and playwright
- Eric Dever, painter
- Barbaralee Diamonstein-Spielvogel, preservationist, historian, writer, and New York City Landmarks Preservation Commissioner
- Katrina Rose Dideriksen, actress and singer
- Monica Dogra, actress and musician
- Emira D'Spain, model and social media influencer
- Shefali Razdan Duggal, political activist, diplomat, and United States ambassador to the Netherlands in the Biden Administration
- Mary Beth Edelson, artist
- Claire Fagin, nurse, academic, and educator
- Vernice Ferguson, nurse and healthcare executive
- Steven Feifke, jazz pianist and composer
- Jack Fina, bandleader, songwriter, and pianist (as New York College of Music)
- Margaret Anne Florence, actress, singer, and model
- William Gaines, founder and publisher of Mad magazine
- Nolan Gasser, composer, pianist, and musicologist
- Catherine Alicia Georges, nurse
- Albert Glinsky, composer and author
- Ann Grifalconi, author and illustrator of children's books
- Jerry Gonzalez, jazz trumpeter and percussionist (as New York College of Music)
- Happy Hairston, professional basketball player
- Daniel M. Hausman, philosopher
- Dorothy Height, civil rights and women's rights activist
- Loyce Houlton, dancer, choreographer, dance pedagogue, and arts administrator
- Delores G. Kelley, American politician from Maryland
- Amy Kohn, composer, lyricist, singer, pianist and accordionist
- Teresa Patterson Hughes, educator, politician, and California State Senator
- Kathy Iandoli, journalist and author (also faculty)
- Arielle Jacobs, singer and actress
- Robert Jarvik, developer of the artificial heart
- Jay Armstrong Johnson, actor, singer, and dancer
- Susan Kare, artist and graphic designer
- William Loren Katz, teacher, historian, and author of African-American history
- Lucy Kelston, operatic soprano (as New York College of Music)
- Jerome Kern, composer of musical theatre and popular music (as New York College of Music)
- Kevin Kern, Broadway actor
- Daniela Lalita, musician, model, and artist
- Burt Lancaster, actor
- Lauv, singer, songwriter, and record producer
- Emily Lazar, mastering engineer and founder and president of The Lodge
- Tania León, conductor and composer
- Daniel Lind-Ramos, painter and sculptor
- Sheila Lukins, cook and food writer
- Joe LaPorta, mastering engineer at Sterling Sound
- Annie B. Martin, labor and civil rights activist
- Barry Manilow, pop singer and songwriter (as New York College of Music)
- Inonge Mbikusita-Lewanika, politician and Ambassador of the Republic of Zambia to the United States
- Frank McCourt, author
- Miles McMillan, model, actor, and painter
- Ruthie Ann Miles, musical theatre actress and singer
- Marvin Miller, executive director of the Major League Baseball Players Association
- Velmanette Montgomery, politician and New York State Senator
- Bruce Morrow, radio host
- Ildaura Murillo-Rohde, nurse, academic, and UN Representative to UNICEF
- Needlz, record producer and songwriter
- Jules Olitski, painter, printmaker, and sculptor
- Gemma Peacocke, composer
- Lenny Pickett, saxophonist and musical director for the Saturday Night Live Band (also faculty)
- Pearl Primus, dancer and choreographer
- Joya Powell, dancer, choreographer, and educator
- Joseph Reagle, digital technology and culture scholar (also faculty)
- Cornelius L. Reid, author and vocal pedagogue specializing in the bel canto technique (as New York College of Music)
- Ian Riccaboni, professional wrestling commentator
- Will Roland, actor and singer
- Charlotte Ronson, fashion designer
- Hafiz Sahar, academic scholar, educator, and author
- Martin Scorsese, multi award-winning filmmaker
- Paul Scheer, actor, comedian, writer, and director
- Matthew Sklar, composer for musical theatre, television, and film
- John Patrick Shanley, screenwriter, playwright, and director
- Elena Shaddow, musical theatre performer and vocal coach
- Joel Shapiro, sculptor
- Wayne Shorter, jazz saxophonist and composer
- Tillotama Shome, film actress
- Marilyn Singer, children's book author
- Alan Silva, jazz double bassist and keyboardist (as New York College of Music)
- Ferdinand Sorenson, music educator (as New York College of Music)
- Eileen Southern, musicologist, researcher, author, and teacher
- Olivia Smith, journalist
- Meng Tang, media artist and art curator
- Harriet Taub, executive director of Materials for the Arts
- Cecil Taylor, pianist, poet, and pioneer of free jazz (as New York College of Music)
- Dara Taylor, composer for film and television
- LeRoy T. Walker, track and field coach and president of the United States Olympic Committee
- Andrew Watt, record producer, singer, songwriter, and multi-instrumentalist
- Harvey Weisenberg, politician
- Austin Wintory, composer for video games and film
- Michael Zimmer, privacy and data ethics scholar

== Notable faculty ==
Steinhardt's notable faculty include and have included:

- Mark Adamo, composer and librettist known for his opera Little Women
- Arjun Appadurai, anthropologist, globalization theorist, media scholar, and Professor Emeritus of Media, Culture, and Communication
- Richard Arum, sociologist of education
- Rodney Benson, scholar of comparative news media systems
- Amy Bentley, food studies professor and researcher
- Harolyn Blackwell, operatic soprano
- Roscoe Brown, education professor and one of the Tuskegee Airmen
- Dana Burde, political scientist and director of International Education
- Meg Bussert, actress, singer, and musical theatre professor
- Nicole Fleetwood, art curator, author, and Paulette Goddard Professor in Media, Culture, and Communication
- James W. Fraser, educationalist, pastor, and academic administrator
- Alexander Gemignani, Broadway actor, tenor, musician, and conductor
- Carol Gilligan, feminist, ethicist, and psychologist
- RoseLee Goldberg, art historian, author, critic, and curator of performance art
- Ed Goodgold, music industry executive and writer known for coining the term "trivia"
- Jonathan Haas, timpanist and percussion studies professor
- Eduardus Halim, pianist and inaugural holder of the Sascha Gorodnitzki Chair in Piano Studies
- Perry Halkitis, psychological researcher and Professor Emeritus
- Shadi Harouni, artist and art critic
- Lyle Ashton Harris, artist in photographic media, collage, installation art and performance art
- Jennifer Hill, statistician specializing in causal inference with applications to social statistics
- Martha Hill, dance instructor
- Kathy Iandoli, journalist and author (also alum)
- James Weldon Johnson, author, politician, poet, civil rights activist, and educator
- Charlton McIlwain, author and academic focused on race and media in politics and social life
- Teboho Moja, educationist, academic, author, and activist
- Marion Nestle, nutritionist, public health advocate, and Paulette Goddard Professor of Nutrition and Food Studies Emerita
- Susan B. Neuman, educator, and researcher in early childhood and literacy development
- Jeanne L. Noble, educator and government administrator
- Janice Pendarvis, singer, songwriter, voiceover artist, and vocal coach
- Neil Postman, education reformer, author, media critic, and creator of the Department of Media Ecology
- Lenny Pickett, saxophonist and musical director for the Saturday Night Live Band (also alum)
- Diane Ravitch, historian of education, educational policy analyst, and former U.S. Assistant Secretary of Education
- Joseph Reagle, digital technology and culture scholar (also alum)
- Louise Rosenblatt, scholar on the teaching of literature and director of the doctoral program in English Education
- John Scofield, jazz-rock guitarist and composer
- Elena Shaddow, musical theatre performer and vocal coach (also alum)
- Linda Sormin, ceramics artist
- Marita Sturken, scholar, author, professor, and critic
- Lee Summers, actor, composer, theatre producer, and drama professor
- Jacob Weinberg, pianist and composer (as New York College of Music)
- Julia Wolfe, composer and professor of music
- Hale Woodruff, printmaker, muralist, draftsman, and painter
- Hirokazu Yoshikawa, community and developmental psychologist and Courtney Sale Ross Professor of Globalization and Education
