= Eric Dever =

American painter

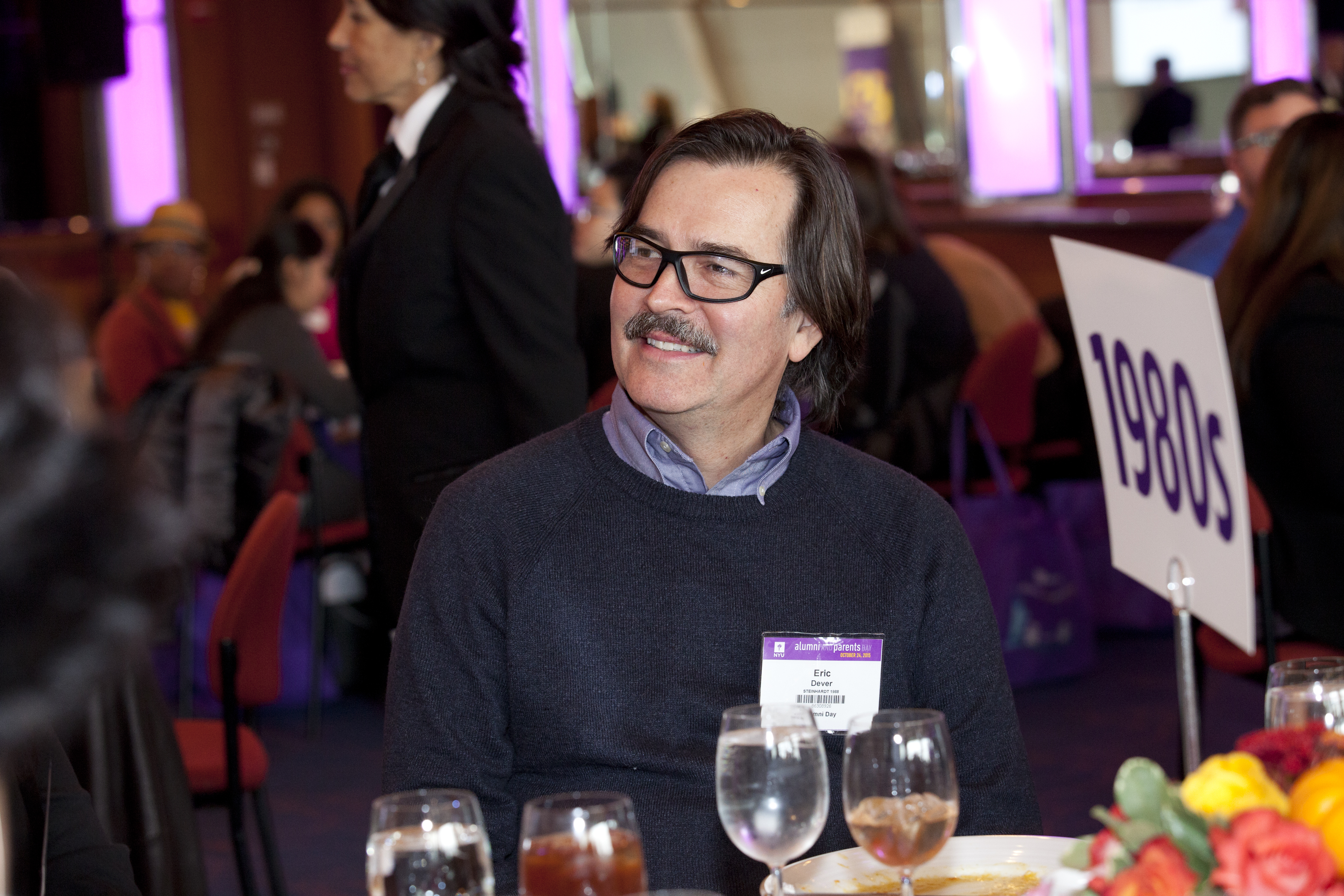
Dever celebrates with New York University and the Steinhardt School, Alumni Day and the opening of his exhibition Clarity, Passion and Dark Inertia in 2015.

Eric Dever (born 1962) is an American painter. His paintings are held in the collections of Grey Art Gallery New York University, the Parrish Art Museum, Guild Hall Museum, and the Heckscher Museum of Art. Dever has exhibited throughout the United States since the early 1990s, including exhibitions in France, Hong Kong and Helsinki.

== Early life and education ==
Dever was born and raised in Los Angeles, California. He studied at the Otis College of Art and Design on a pre college full scholarship and received his Bachelor of Arts degree from California Lutheran University in 1984. Two years later, he moved to the East Coast to study painting at New York University, Steinhardt School, where he received his Master of Arts degree in 1988. Painter Marcia Hafif was among the faculty at the NYU Steinhart School, and offered students a visit to her studio, where she was grinding pigments as part of her on going examination of paint media, which had a powerful and lasting influence on Dever's own work.

== Work ==
Beginning in 1988, Dever worked part time in the architectural firm of Pei Cobb Freed & Partners in New York, while continuing to exhibit his paintings. In 2002 Dever moved to the East End of Long Island, where he embarked on a decade long process, working for 4 years with white paint alone, examining the material properties of oil paint and support. It was not until he had introduced black that he realized he was working with light itself. In 2010, Dever began testing a variety of prepared red hues and selected Naphthol Scarlet, closest in hue to Vermillion, a color 9th century alchemists formulated with sulfur and mercury. Dever's sudden experience of color was very exciting as the possibilities grew larger and more complex. He began to develop a sense of mixing qualities of light, energy and matter, as one might mix color or hue. The dark hued paintings feel heavy or dense, and those mixed with red appear explosive, others very light, while each painting remains related and part of a whole. Dever's examination of color phenomena also echo his studies of material nature, as presented in Samkhya philosophy, Patanjali's Yoga Sutras and the Bhagavad Gita (14.5.)

At Guild Hall in East Hampton, New York, Dever's 5 x 10 foot cloud inspired painting was placed on stage for Joseph Pintauro's play, Cloud Life, as part of "The Painting Plays" in 2012. This collaboration, "... Pintauro admires for what he sees as its struggle between Dever's signature reductive color minimalism and the artist's morphing into representation..."

In 2014 Berry Campbell exhibited a selection of Dever's paintings, his first exhibition with the gallery. Two paintings travelled to the US Consulate General of Hong Kong and Macau for an Art in Embassies, Department of State exhibition, 2016-19. A rose from Dever's garden was the starting point for this group of paintings, which he deconstructed with line and form, revealing the energetic qualities of color.

Dever's second exhibition with Berry Campbell, "Painting in a House Made of Air", filled the New York gallery with the artist's bold use of saturated, electric and sometimes acid color, offering references to Lee Krasner, Joan Mitchell, and Andy Warhol. The paintings build on Dever's transformation as noted in The East Hampton Star in April 2017, for more than 10 years he had limited his palette to white, black, and red. Dever's painting now draws inspiration from his garden and the full color spectrum in a new body of work.

An early pandemic studio view in 2020 reveals paintings and a closer look at the unfolding spring palette, informed by walks and the overhead blossoming tree canopy. The resulting paintings often appear weightless as forms dematerialize, reversing figure and ground. Dever was invited to present 12 related paintings mounted on posts in his front yard, featured in The New York Times, for an outdoor "Drive-By" exhibition, which included 52 artists on properties spanning Hampton Bays to Montauk on the South Fork of Eastern Long Island, New York. Social isolation was one theme, while providing a cultural activity during the isolation of the pandemic.

By the end of 2020, Dever had completed an Andy Warhol Foundation/Nature Conservancy-Montauk Project Artist residency. The Warhol Reserve is located at the eastern most tip of Long Island. His paintings from this project highlight the palette of seasonal blue northeastern summer hues. Midpoint through the project, he began exploring adjacent Montauket ancestral lands and vistas. Taking cues from Andy Warhol's self portrait, pairing complementary or opposite colors, he reimagines a view of Scallop Pond and Paumonok Path, the path itself dedicated to Montauket King, Stephen Talkhouse Pharoah.

Berry Campbell presented in 2022 its third exhibition of paintings by Eric Dever which featured 19 recent paintings created in the artist's Southampton, New York, studio. The name Dever chose for this body of work, To Look at Things in Bloom, is adapted from a line of verse in the Loveliest of Trees by the English classical scholar and poet, A. E. Housman (1859-1936). These paintings continue the artist's exploration of nature, inspired by his surroundings from his childhood in Los Angeles to his present-day home in Eastern Long Island. In the exhibition catalogue essay, Gail Levin PhD writes:

"Not surprisingly, Dever's new pictures do not seek to replicate nature, but instead vibrate between representation and abstraction, a kind of rhythmic dance expressing both what he later recalls in his mind's eye and, simultaneously, how exhilarated he feels while he loses himself in nature..."

Dever does not paint nature, he paints his experience of it. His personal expression calls to mind an earlier painter who also migrated from Los Angeles to New York City to study painting, then moved out to the Hamptons on Long Island's East End: Jackson Pollock, who famously responded to Hans Hofmann's question, 'Do you work from nature?' by proclaiming: 'I am nature.' As it did for Pollock, the natural landscape on Long Island offers Dever both stimulation and direction that has found its way into his paintings.

In Dever's Southampton studio, set in a garden he designed, the diptych Lily of the Nile (also called Agapanthus and featured in another of the new works) recalls the garden of Claude Monet (1840-1926) in Giverny, France, which inspired Monet's late paintings of waterlilies that moved toward abstraction. Critics have linked Monet's late 'all-over painting' to Pollock's abstractions. Dever's depiction of the lavender blue agapanthus extends over two large canvases in this gestural tradition.

Dever was the 2021/2022 Artist in Residence at the Parrish Art Museum, Water Mill, New York. In 2022, his painting, October 10th, was chosen by the Art in Embassies Program for the United States Embassy Residence in Helsinki, Finland. Sampled colorful morning glory blossoms form the scaffolding of this painting and echo Dever's self identification with nature. The blossoms themselves reflect the distance and collection of pollen by bees within a 3.6 mile radius of his Water Mill studio garden, where hives are tended on site. Dever's oeuvre embraces a history of shared growth between the artist, his garden and painting itself. In January 2022, he gave a lecture, Nature into Art, at the Pollock-Krasner House and Study Center, East Hampton, New York. Recently the Heckscher Museum of Art, Huntington, New York, acquired a painting for its permanent collection.

"Points of Interest" 2025, marks Dever's fourth exhibition with Berry Campbell, featuring 20 large format paintings and a catalog essay by Giovanni Aloi, excerpt below:

"In Eric Dever’s paintings, time is neither background nor metaphor, it is substance. Just as the garden stages a choreography of slow unfolding, Dever’s canvases are accumulations of temporal gestures, each brushstroke a pulse in the continuum of material and spiritual becomings. The plants he paints—roses, nasturtium, magnolias—do not merely immortalize the gorgeousness of nature; they participate in a visual process where matter and memory grow together, entwined like tendrils. Color, often layered in luminous strata or scraped back to show the weave of the canvas’s coarse linen, functions not as surface decoration but as temporal sediment. The unpainted portions of the canvas breathe with absence marking intervals of reflection, loss, or evoking the elusive work of subterranean life. These voids are not empty; they hold the same potentiality as a wintering bulb or a fallow field.

"Painting, for Dever, is a kind of cultivation: an aesthetic tending through which growth, decay, and renewal are made visible in oil and wax. In this way, his work does not merely depict plants but it performs a deep vegetal attunement. The canvas becomes a zone where the temporalities of the garden, the artist, and planetary revolutions can align: poetic detritus, traces of moments lived across multiple root systems, invisibly connected, actual, as well as metaphorical. Here, painting is not a record of time passed, but a field of potentialities anchored by vegetal wisdom."

== Selected one-person exhibitions ==
- 2026 Springtide, Greenville County Museum of Art, Greenville, South Carolina
- 2025 Points of Interest, Berry Campbell, New York
- 2025 The Warhol Montauk Project, The Bridgehampton Museum, Bridgehampton, New York
- 2022 Eric Dever: To Look at Things in Bloom, Berry Campbell, New York
- 2021 Eric Dever: The Montauk Series, presented by Berry Campbell Gallery on Artsy (online exhibition)
- 2020 A Thousand Nows, Lyceum Gallery, Suffolk County Community College-Eastern Campus, Riverhead, New York
- 2019 Painting in a House Made of Air, Berry Campbell Gallery, New York
- 2017 Light, Energy and Matter, William H. Hannon Library, and Master of Arts in Yoga Studies at Loyola Marymount University, Los Angeles, California
- 2015 Clarity, Passion and Dark Inertia, Kimmel Galleries, New York University, New York, an exhibition of 29 paintings which brings the viewer on a journey, similar to the path of the artist himself.
- 2014 Eric Dever, Berry Campbell Gallery, New York
- The Rose Chapel, Kaiser Art Gallery, Molloy College, Rockville Centre, New York

== Selected group exhibitions ==
- 2026 Material Speaks, The Bridgehampton Museum. Bridgehampton, New York
- 2025 Real, Surreal, Photoreal, Nassau County Museum of Art. Roslyn Harbor, New York
- 2024 Seeing Red: From Renoir to Warhol, Nassau County Museum of Art. Roslyn Harbor, New York (2024–25)
- The Rains are Changing Fast: New Acquisitions in Context. The Heckscher Museum of Art, Huntington, New York
- 2023 U.S. Embassy residence in Helsinki, Finland. Art in Embassies, Department of State (2023–24)
- 2022 A Visual Conversation (artist resident project and student collaboration), Parrish Art Museum. Water Mill, New York
- 2020 Drive-By-Art, Public Art in the Moment of Social Distancing. South Fork, Long Island, New York
- 2017 Parrish Perspectives: New Works in Context. Parrish Art Museum, Water Mill, New York
- Debt Fair, Occupy Museums, Whitney Biennial. Whitney Museum of American Art, New York
- 2016 U.S. Consulate General Hong Kong and Macau. Art in Embassies, Department of State (2016–19)
- 2014 Redacted: Connecting Dots Through a Shifting Field. Islip Art Museum, East Islip, New York
- 2011 Doucement. ParisCONCRET, Paris, France
