= Amy Bentley =

American nutritional scientist (born 1962)

Amy Bentley is Professor of Food Studies in the Department of Nutrition and Food Studies at New York University's Steinhardt School of Culture, Education, and Human Development, and is co-founder of the NYU Urban Farm Lab and the Experimental Cuisine Collective.

She completed her PhD in American Civilization at the University of Pennsylvania. Her research interests are wide-ranging and include the social and cultural history of food, food systems, nutrition and health. Her diverse interests in food studies have resulted in multiple publications in journals, books and on social media covering topics as diverse as the politicisation of domesticity under American food rationing in World War II to a review of anthropologist Sidney Mintz's examination of the sugar industry.

== Awards ==
- "Inventing Baby Food: Taste, Health, and the Industrialization of the American Diet" won "Best Book Award" from the Association for the Study of Food and Society (ASFS) in 2015.
- "Inventing Baby Food: Taste, Health, and the Industrialization of the American Diet" was a finalist for the James Beard Foundation Award for "Reference and Scholarship" in 2015.

== Selected bibliography ==
Books

- Inventing Baby Food: Taste, Health, and the Industrialization of the American Diet. University of California Press (September, 2014).
- Eating for Victory: Food Rationing and the Politics of Domesticity (Urbana: The University of Illinois Press, 1998)

Edited Volumes

- Bentley, Amy and Hi’ilei Hobart. "Food in Recent U.S. History." In Food in Time and Place: The American Historical Association Companion to Food History, eds. Paul Freedman, Joyce E. Chaplin, and Ken Albala (University of California Press, 2014): 165–187.
- Yelvington, Kevin A. and Amy Bentley, "Mintz, Sidney," in R. Jon McGee and Richard L. Warms (eds.), Theory in Social and Cultural Anthropology: An Encyclopedia, Los Angeles: Sage Reference (2013), pp. 548–552.
- "Sustenance, Abundance, and the Place of Food in United States Histories." In Kyri Claflin and Peter Scholliers, eds. Global Food Historiography: Researchers, Writers, & the Study of Food (Berg, 2012), pp. 72–86.
- "Sustenance, Abundance, and the Place of Food in United States Histories." In Kyri Claflin and Peter Scholliers, eds. Global Food Historiography: Researchers, Writers, & the Study of Food (Berg, 2012), pp. 72–86.

Articles

- "Growing Concerns." The Times Literary Supplement (March 25, 2016).
- "Hands that Itch to Hold the Spoon." In Pathways to Family Wellness, 49 (Spring 2016), 40–42.
- "The Frontiers of Food Studies," with Belasco et al. Food, Culture and Society, Vol, 14, No. 3, (September, 2011):301-314.
- "Eating in Class: Gastronomy, Taste, Nutrition, and Teaching Food History," with Bender at al. Radical History Review, 110 (Spring 2011): 197–216.
- "Historians and the Study of Material Culture," with Auslander, et al. American Historical Review, 114(December 2009): 1355–1404.
- “Introduction” and Guest Editor, “Sweetness and Power: Rethinking Sidney Mintz’s Classic Work.” Food and Foodways, Vol. 16, No. 2 (2008)

== Professional activities ==
Bentley serves on a number of editorial and advisory boards dedicated to food studies, including the journals Food, Culture and Society: An International Journal of Multidisciplinary Research and Food and Foodways: Exploration in the History and Culture of Human Nourishment.
