= Edward Shore =

Edward Shore may refer to:

- Edward Shore (footballer)
- Edward W. Shore, ice hockey player

== See also ==
- Edward Shaw (disambiguation)
