= Shadi Harouni =

Iranian-American artist (born 1985)

- Born: 1985 (age 40–41); Hamadan, Iran
- Education: University of Southern California (BA); NYU Steinhardt (MFA)
- Employer: NYU Steinhardt; Parsons The New School for Design
- Awards: Guggenheim Fellowship (2024)

Shadi Harouni (born 1985) is an Iranian Kurdish artist and art critic based in the United States. A 2024 Guggenheim Fellowship, she explores the resistance in Kurdistan in her work, which includes installation art, photography, and video. She is currently Assistant Professor of Video and Photography at the NYU Steinhardt Department of Art and Art Professions.

== Biography ==
Shadi Harouni was born in 1985 in Hamadan, Iran, to Iranian Kurdish revolutionaries, before being exiled to the United States. After obtaining her BA from the University of Southern California, she later moved to NYU Steinhardt, where she obtained her MFA and started working as a professor, teaching art history and critical theory. At NYU Steinhardt's Department of Art and Art Professions, she has served as Head of Photography and Video, and originally served as Director of Undergraduate Studies from 2017 until 2023. In 2019, she was the acting director of Skowhegan School of Painting and Sculpture. She also worked at the Parsons The New School for Design as a teacher.

Harouni's themes in her work, which include photography and film, include the resistance in Kurdistan, as well as remembrance. Her installation "Things" appeared at the Hudson Valley Center for Contemporary Art's 2011 First Look III exhibition. ArtAsiaPacific said of her 2015 video The Lightest of Stones and the Heaviest of Men, exhibited at Queens International 2016: "while her action in itself is reminiscent of other Sisyphean-themed works such as Francis Alÿs's When Faith Moves Mountains ... there is another dimension to Harouni's work due to the quarry workers' commentary that breaks the existential facade of the performance". She was awarded a Guggenheim Fellowship in 2024.

In addition to art, she wrote a few art exhibition reviews for Tehran Bureau.
