= Ernest O. Melby =

American academic administrator (1891–1987)

Ernest Oscar Melby (August 16, 1891 – January 11, 1987) was a professor, dean, and university president.

== Background ==
Ernest Oscar Melby was born in Lake Park, Minnesota. He was the son of Ole Hans Melby and Ellen (Stakke) Melby. Melby received his B.A. from St. Olaf College in Northfield, Minnesota, in 1913. He attended graduate school at the University of Minnesota to receive his master's degree and Ph.D. He married Aurora Herbert on December 29, 1914. Aurora and Ernest Melby met in Alexandria, Minnesota, when he was a physics teacher. They had one child, Stanley Herbert Melby.

== Career ==
Melby began his career as a high school teacher and principal in Minnesota before serving for nine years as the superintendent of schools in Long Prairie, Black Duck and Brewster, Minnesota. In 1928, he was appointed assistant professor of education at Northwestern University, where he conducted prolific research on the administration of several Illinois school districts, the results of which were published in 1929 and 1930. As a result, he was rapidly promoted to associate professor and professor. In 1934, he was named dean of the School of Education at Northwestern, a position he held until 1941 when his antagonistic relationship with Northwestern President Franklyn Bliss Snyder deteriorated to the point where Melby resigned.

Melby assumed the presidency of Montana State University (later the University of Montana), a post he held from 1941 to 1943 and from 1944 to 1945. In 1943, he became chancellor of the University of Montana. From 1945 to 1956, Melby served as dean of the School of Education (now Steinhardt School of Culture, Education, and Human Development) at New York University.

Melby joined the faculty of the College of Education at Michigan State University in 1956 following his retirement from New York University. Originally intending to stay for just one year, he worked for 19 years before retiring in 1975.

In 1975, Melby accepted a distinguished professorship at Florida Atlantic University where he founded and served as consultant to Florida Atlantic University's Center for Community Education. Melby also served as a special consultant to the Charles Stewart Mott Foundation.

== Selected works ==
- "American Education Is in Danger". ADL Bulletin. May 1951.
- "American Education under Fire: The Story of the 'Phony Three-R Fight'". The New York Times Magazine. September 23, 1951.
- Administering Community Education. Prentice-Hall. 1955.
- The Role of the School in Community Education. Pendell Publishing Company. 1969.

== Ernest O. Melby Internship ==
The Ernest O. Melby Internship at Florida Atlantic University makes funds available to a student enrolled in the Department of Educational Leadership who is interested in the field of community education/community schools.

== Ernest O. and Aurora H. Melby Endowed Fellowship ==
The Ernest O. and Aurora H. Melby Endowed Fellowship was established through the estates of Ernest and Aurora Melby in 1994 following the death of Aurora Melby at 102. The fellowship is designated for students in the Department of Educational Administration at Michigan State University.

== Ernest O. Melby Community Education Center ==
The Ernest O. Melby Community Education Center at Florida Atlantic University was founded in 1967 with a grant from the Charles Stewart Mott Foundation. On February 12, 1988, the center was formally named in honor of Ernest O. Melby.
