= Gemma Peacocke =

New Zealand-American composer

- Born: Gemma Rachel Peacocke; Hamilton, New Zealand
- Education: Victoria University of Wellington; New Zealand School of Music; NYU Steinhardt; Princeton University
- Occupation: Composer
- Website: gemmapeacocke.com

Gemma Rachel Peacocke is a composer from New Zealand based in the United States.

== Biography ==
Peacocke grew up in Hamilton, New Zealand. She studied at Victoria University of Wellington and the New Zealand School of Music, followed by a master's degree in composition and theory at New York University's Steinhardt School of Culture, Education, and Human Development. Julia Wolfe was her primary teacher there. In 2015 she studied at the Institute for Music/Acoustic Research and Coordination (IRCAM) in Paris. Peacocke is a doctoral student in composition at Princeton University and holds the Mark Nelson Ph.D. Fellowship. Peacocke formerly managed and taught with the New York Philharmonic Very Young Composers program. She is founder of the Kinds of Kings Collective.

Peacocke's music combines acoustic instruments and voices with electronics, and her work often has a sociopolitical focus. Much of her work focuses on the marginalisation of women; her string quartet Erasure is about the erasure of women's achievements from mainstream history. Peacocke also collaborates with directors, filmmakers and choreographers to write music for theatre, film and dance performances.

=== Awards ===
In 2014 and 2015 Peacocke was awarded the Creative New Zealand Edwin Carr Scholarship.

== Recordings ==
- Waves & Lines by Gemma Peacocke with soprano Eliza Bagg, released on New Amsterdam Records (2019)
