= Hirokazu Yoshikawa =

American community and developmental psychologist

Hirokazu Yoshikawa (Japanese: 吉川博和, Hepburn: Yoshikawa Hirokazu) is an American psychologist.

Yoshikawa earned a Bachelor of Arts in English literature from Yale University in 1987, followed by a Masters in Music for piano performance from the Juilliard School in 1989. Yoshikawa then turned his attention to psychology, earning a Master's of Arts and a doctorate in the subject from New York University in 1992 and 1998, respectively. Yoshikawa remained at NYU as faculty until 2005. He then moved to the Harvard Graduate School of Education. From 2011 to 2013, Yoshikawa held the Walter H. Gale Professorship of Education and was academic dean of the HGSE. Yoshikawa subsequently returned to NYU's Steinhardt School of Culture, Education, and Human Development, as the Courtney Sale Ross Professor of Globalization and Education.

== Awards and honors ==
Yoshikawa is a 2014 fellow of the National Academy of Education. In 2018, the American Academy of Political and Social Science elected him the James S. Coleman Fellow. Yoshikawa was elected a fellow of the American Academy of Arts and Sciences in 2019.

== Selected books ==
- Yoshikawa, Hirokazu; Weisner, Thomas S.; Lowe, Edward D., eds. (2006). Making It Work: Low-Wage Employment, Family Life, and Child Development. Russell Sage Foundation. ISBN 9780871549730. JSTOR 10.7758/9781610445658.ResearchGate:316964325
- Yoshikawa, Hirokazu (2011). Immigrants Raising Citizens: Undocumented Parents and Their Young Children. Russell Sage Foundation. ISBN 9780871549860.ResearchGate:286320927
- Chaudry, Ajay; Morrissey, Taryn; Weiland, Christina; Yoshikawa, Hirokazu (2017). Cradle to Kindergarten: A New Plan to Combat Inequality. Russell Sage Foundation. ISBN 9780871545572. JSTOR 10.7758/9781610448666.
