= Perry N. Halkitis =

American psychologist

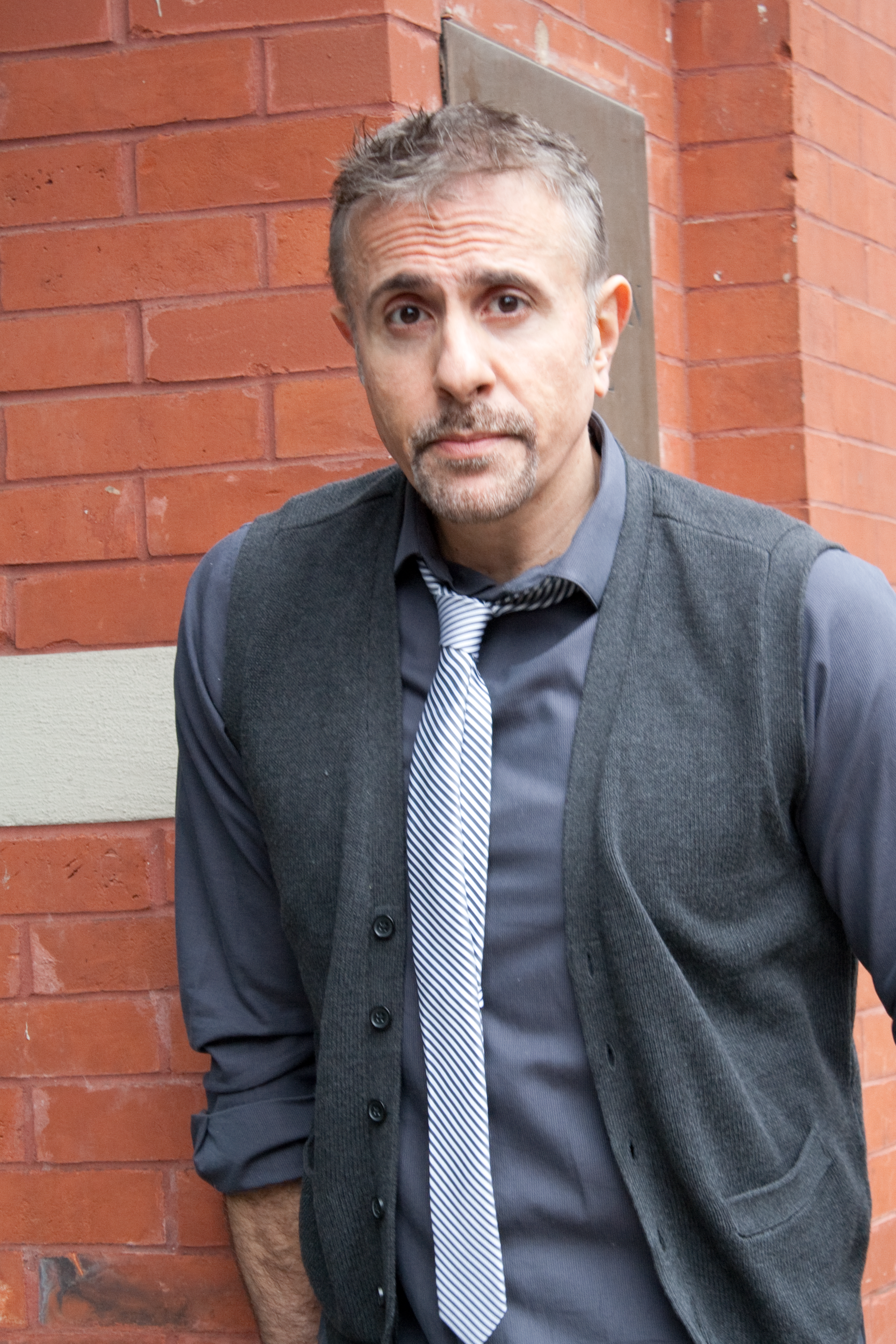
- Born: February 24, 1963 (age 63); New York, New York
- Education: Columbia College (BA); City University of New York (MS, PhD, MPH)
- Occupation: Professor
- Writing career
- Subject: Psychology / Public Health
- Website: www.chibps.org perrynhalkitis.com

Perry N. Halkitis (born February 24, 1963) is an American public health psychologist and applied statistician known for his research on the health of LGBT populations with an emphasis on HIV/AIDS, substance use and mental health. Perry is Dean and Professor of Biostatistics, Health Education and Behavioral Science at the Rutgers School of Public Health.

Between 1998 and 2017, Perry was a faculty member at New York University, serving in a variety of capacities, the last of which was Senior Association Dean for Academic and Faculty Affairs at the College of Global Public Health and Professor of Global Public Health, Applied Psychology and Medicine. He is also the founder and director of the Center for Health, Identity, Behavior and Prevention Studies (CHIBPS) at New York University. The bio-behavioral funded research site founded by him also serves as a training site for public health, psychology, medical and student scholars working in the arena of LGBT health disparities informed by a theory of syndemics.

== Biography ==
Halkitis is of Greek ancestry. He received his B.A. in Biology and Psychology from Columbia College, his masters in Education/Human Development and Learning from City University of New York (CUNY): Hunter College, a Masters of Philosophy in Educational Psychology from CUNY Graduate Center, and a Ph.D. in Quantitative Methods in Educational and Psychological Research from CUNY: Graduate Center. Before moving to Rutgers, Halkitis was previously Associate Dean for Research & Doctoral Studies, Professor of Applied Psychology and Public Health, and Director of the Center for Health, Identity, Behavior & Prevention Studies (CHIBPS) at the Steinhardt School of Culture, Education, and Human Development, a division of New York University. Halkitis has been actively involved in governance with the American Psychological Association Committee on Psychology and AIDS, (COPA) 2010-2012 and the Committee on Lesbian, Gay, Bisexual and Transgender Concerns, Halkitis is also a research affiliate of the Aaron Diamond AIDS Research Center at New York University School of Medicine. and co-director of the New York University's Clinical and Translational Science Institute TL1 Predoctoral Program. Prior to his current positions, Halkitis was Director of Research at Gay Men's Health Crisis. He is internationally recognized for his work examining the intersection between the HIV, drug abuse, and mental health syndemics, and is well known as one of the nation's leading experts on addictions, especially methamphetamine. In addition, Halkitis has undertaken extensive work in psychometrics.

He serves on the Committee on Psychology and AIDS, (COPA) 2010-2012 and the Committee on Lesbian, Gay, Bisexual and Transgender Concerns, Halkitis is also a research affiliate of the Aaron Diamond AIDS Research Center at New York University School of Medicine. and co-director of the New York University's Clinical and Translational Science Institute TL1 Predoctoral Program. Prior to his current positions, Halkitis was Director of Research at Gay Men's Health Crisis.

=== Degrees held ===
- B.A. Columbia College 1984, Biology & Psychology
- M.S. Hunter College, City University of New York 1988, Education/Human Development & Learning
- M.Phil. Graduate Center, City University of New York 1993, Educational Psychology
- Ph.D. Graduate Center, City University of New York 1995, Psychology: Quantitative Methods in Psychology & Education
- MPH CUNY School of Public Health 2013, Epidemiology

== Research ==
Halkitis’ research examines how risk-taking is influenced by interpersonal, contextual and cultural factors, especially with regard to the AIDS pandemic and drug abuse in the United States, and this research has been funded by various private and public entities including the National Institutes of Health, Centers for Disease Control and Prevention, New York City Department of Health, New York State AIDS Institute, The New York Community Trust, United Way of America, and American Psychological Foundation. The focus of his research involves health, human behavior, and development, with a specific application to the domains of HIV/AIDS and drug abuse, which has addressed some of most important social and public health issues of our time.

== Publications ==
=== Books ===
- Halkitis, P.N. (2013). The AIDS Generation: Stories and Survival of Resilience. The AIDS Generation: Stories and Survival of Resilience
- Halkitis, P. N. (2009). Methamphetamine addiction: Biological foundations, psychological factors, and social consequences. Washington, DC: American Psychological Association.
- Halkitis, P. N. Wilton, L., & Drescher, J. (Eds.). (2006). Barebacking: Psychosocial and public health approaches. Binghamton, New York: Haworth Press.
- Halkitis, P. N., Gomez, C., & Wolitski, R. (Eds.) (2005). HIV + sex: The psychological and interpersonal dynamics of HIV-seropositive gay and bisexual men's relationships. Washington DC: American Psychological Association.

== Awards ==
Halkitis is the recipient of numerous awards from both professional and community-based organizations, and was elected a fellow of the New York Academy of Medicine in 2005.

- 1999: American Psychological Foundation (APF), Wayne F. Placek Award
- 2000: New York University, Steinhardt School, Daniel E. Griffiths Research Award
- 2002: American Psychological Association, Committee on Psychology & AIDS, Leadership Award
- 2003: American Psychological Association, Division on Lesbian, Gay, and Bisexual Concerns, Distinguished Research Award
- 2004: New York University, Office of LGBT Student Services, Award for Outstanding Commitment to the Queer Community
- 2004: New York University, Steinhardt School, Teaching Excellence Award
- 2005: TheBody.com, HIV Prevention Leader Award
- 2005: New York Academy of Medicine, Elected Fellow
- 2006: American Psychological Association, Committee on Lesbian, Gay & Bisexual Concerns, Outstanding Achievement Award
- 2007: Society of Behavioral Medicine, Elected Fellow
- 2009: American Psychological Association, Division of Addictions, Elected Fellow
- 2009: New York University Distinguished Teaching Award Nominee
- 2010: New York University Distinguished Teaching Award Nominee
- 2010: New York University, Office of LGBT Student Services Award for Student Centered Dedication and Advocacy
- 2010: Society of Behavioral Medicine, Research to Practice Dissemination Award
- 2010: American Psychological Association, Award for Distinguished Contributions to Psychology In Public Interest (Early Career)
