= Meng Tang =

Chinese-American artist

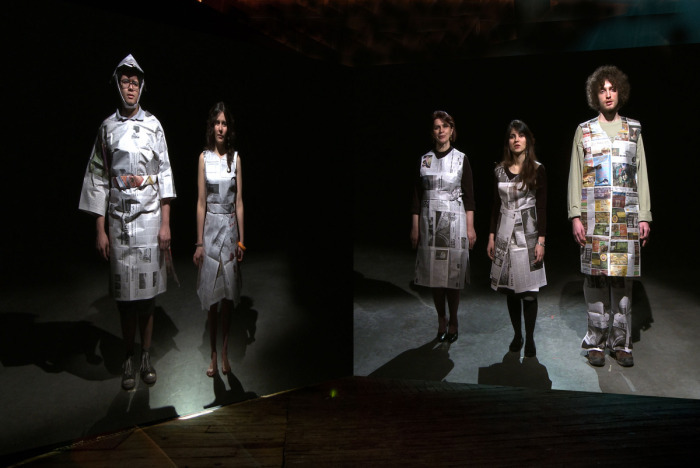
- Babel by Meng Tang
- Born: Meng Tang (唐夢); Tianjin, China
- Education: University of Minnesota, New York University, Beijing Academy of Arts
- Known for: Photography, vdeo installations, performance art
- Awards: Distinguished Alumni of the University of Minnesota China Center, Minnesota Monthly- “Artists to Watch”

Meng Elizabeth Tang (唐夢) is a Chinese-American media artist, art curator, and art professor well known for her photography, video installations and performance art. Tang uses her art to explore the themes of communication, gender, culture & politics. She hones on her experiences growing up in China to create a basis in which she communicates with her audience. Meng who currently resides in the US has featured in several exhibitions internationally including the Ping Yao International Festival. Tang was in 2010 listed as a Distinguished Alumni of the University of Minnesota China Center.

== Career and education ==
Tang was born and raised in Tianjin, China and received her bachelor's degree from the Beijing Film Academy in 1996 and proceeded to earn a master's degree in Media Arts in 2006 from New York University NYU. She also earned an MFA in Experimental New Media, from the University of Minnesota in 2010, where she became the first Chinese national to obtain an MFA from the University.

She began her career as an IT Specialist at the Beijing Film Academy in 1997 and later moved on to become a lecturer in the Department of Cinematography at the Academy. Tang has since held various positions in academia including being a visiting scholar at Duke University and a faculty member at the University of Minnesota Department of Art.

Meng today, who still lectures at the University of Minnesota, sits as the Vice-President of the Minnesota Chapter of the Women’s Caucus for Art (WCA), and the Vice President of the International Association of Female Artists. Meng’s work has been featured & exhibited at the Kobe Biennale in Japan, Chengdu Biennale in China & the Ping Yao International Festival in China

Some of her work like The Soap Factory with Guo Gai & Slinko has drawn some attention from the communist authorities in China, given their very expressive political nature. Guo was in 2011, in unrelated incidents, arrested in China, for attending an event at the Beijing Contemporary Museum of Art that was allegedly related to the "Jasmine Revolution".

== Exhibitions ==
Below are a list of exhibitions Tang has featured in

- 2014 The 14th Pingyao International Photography Festival
- 2013 Saku The Fourth Kobe Biennale, Kobe, Japan
- 2013 Gravitation The Sixth Chengdu Biennale, Chengdu, China
- 2013 Boundary: Art Or Life Museum of Tianjin Academy of Fine Arts, Tianjin, China
- 2012 Conceptual Renewal – A Brief History of Chinese Contemporary Photographical Art Sishang Art Museum, Huosi Rd. East, Zhangxizhuang, Shunyi Dist., Beijing, China
- 2012 Women And Water Rights Exhibition, The Philips Center For The Arts, Hudson, WI.
- 2011 Understanding Politics -Three Artists Exhibition: Soap Factory, 514 Se. 2nd St. Minneapolis, MN
- 2010 Bebal, Katherine E. Nash Gallery, University of Minnesota, Minneapolis, MN
- 2010 Women And Water, Katherine E. Nash Gallery, University of Minnesota, Minneapolis, MN
- 2009 The Rule of Art, Korea Cultural Center, Beijing, China
- 2009 Experimental And Media Arts, Katherine E. Nash Gallery, University of Minnesota, Minneapolis, MN Scholarship Exhibition, Regis Center For Art, Minneapolis, MN
- 2008 Water, Wood, And Sky, Beijing Film Academy Gallery, Beijing, China
- 2008 Why You Belong, Burnet Art Gallery, Minneapolis, MN
- 2008 To The Bind, Rosalux Gallery, Minneapolis, MN
- 2008 Culturing Technology: Art & Technology 1968–2008, Regis Center For Art, Minneapolis, MN
- 2008 New York University, Asian Art Alumni Exhibition, Shanghai, China
- 2007 Time-Line, Human Speed And Technology Speed, Korean Cultural Center, Beijing, China
- 2006 Seven Artists In China, 548 Avant Gallery, 548 W, 28th New York City, NY
- 2005 Butterfly Dreams: Ma Thesis Exhibition, 80 Washington Square East Galleries, NYC, Department of Art And Art Professions, New York University, NY
- 2004 NYU Students Annual Exhibition, NYU Art And Art Professions, New York University, NY
- 1996 BFA Exhibition, Beijing Film Academy Gallery, Beijing, China The Art of Advertisement, Beijing Film Academy Gallery, China
