= Teboho Moja =

American academic and author

- Occupations: Educationist, academic, author and activist

Academic background
- Education: B.A. B.Ed. M.Ed. Ph.D., Curriculum and Instruction
- Alma mater: University of the North; University of Witwatersrand; University of Wisconsin – Madison
- Thesis: Failure in the Teaching of Biology

Academic work
- Institutions: New York University

Teboho Moja is an educationist, academic, author and activist. She is a clinical professor of higher education and the department chair of administration, leadership, and technology at New York University. Additionally, she serves as an extraordinary professor at the University of the Western Cape, a visiting research fellow at the Centre for the Advancement of Scholarship at the University of Pretoria in South Africa, and a distinguished fellow of the International Institute of Migration and Diaspora Studies at the University of Guyana.

Moja's research primarily focuses on higher education policy and globalization of higher education, particularly in Africa. She has authored and co-authored several journal articles and 3 books including Higher Education Policy, Institutions and Globalisation: New Dynamics in South Africa After 1994, National Policy and a Regional Response in South African Higher Education, and Transformation in Higher Education – Global Pressures and Local Realities.

Moja has received the Martin Luther King Jr. Faculty Award, the National Research Foundation Lifetime Achiever Award, Women in International Education Award, and Graduate Students Star Award, all in 2019. She was also awarded an Honorary Doctorate from the University of Pretoria in 2021.

Moja is a Fellow of the Pan-African Scientific Research Council, and the founder and Editor-in-Chief of the Journal of Student Affairs in Africa since 2013. She serves on editorial board of the Journal of Higher Education in Africa and African Journal of Higher Education Studies and Development (Nigeria).

== Education and early career ==
Moja obtained a Bachelor of Arts in 1977 and a Bachelor of Education in 1979, both from the University of the North in South Africa. She began her academic career as a lecturer at Hebron Teacher Training College from 1979 to 1980. In 1982, she earned a Master of Education from the University of Witwatersrand and concurrently served as an Academic Development Officer at the University of the North West until 1985, when she received a Ph.D. in Curriculum and Instruction from the University of Wisconsin-Madison.

== Career ==
Moja served as the Advisor to the Minister of Education and Member of the Interim Strategic Management Team of the Ministry of Education from 1994 to 1995. In the following year, she was appointed by President Mandela as Executive Director & Commissioner of the National Commission on Higher Education (NCHE) in South Africa, during which time the Commission published a national report that provided a plan for reforming higher education in the country. In 1996, she established the South African Broadcasting Corporation's education channel for TV and Radio, while serving as the General Manager. She was then appointed to the UNESCO Institute of Statistic Steering Committee for the transformation of the statistics division in 1998 and later became a member of the UNESCO Africa Scientific Committee in 2006. Furthermore, she served as Special Advisor to two Ministers of Education in South Africa during two distinct periods, initially from 1997 to 1999 and subsequently from 2005 to 2006.

Moja has served in various administrative positions as well. In 1985, she was appointed Senior Academic Development Officer at the Academic Development Centre in the University of the North West, and later promoted to Director of the Academic Development Centre which she remained until 1993. Subsequently, she began working as a Policy Analyst at the Centre for Educational Policy Development (CEPD). Later, she took on the role of Chair of the Council of the University of South Africa. She has been serving on the board of directors of the University World News in Africa since 2015.

Moja continued her academic career as she joined New York University as a visiting professor in 1999. She was later appointed Program Director of the Higher Education Program and has been serving as Clinical Professor, assuming the position of department chair for Administration, Leadership, and Technology in 2020. She also holds appointments as Extraordinary Professor at the University of the Western Cape and Research Scholar at the University of Pretoria. She has been serving as a board member of the National Research Foundation in South Africa.

== Activism ==
Moja served as Chair of the Staff Union at the University of the North West (formerly University of Bophuthatswana), played a role in establishing the National Union of Democratic University Staff Associations (UDUSA), and later served as its president. UDUSA addressed both labor-related matters and policy issues in preparation for the post-apartheid future. Additionally, she held positions in management and as a researcher for the National Education Policy Initiative (NEPI) project, a Mass Democratic Movement Project that produced 30 Reports published by Oxford Press.

== Research ==
Moja has contributed to the field of higher education through her research, focusing on higher education policy, globalization, and educational technology, particularly in South Africa. Over the years, she has focused on education reform related matters, and has been involved in projects that focused on reform issues through the Center for Higher Education Transformation (CHET), for which she was a co-founder with Nico Cloete, and proposed multiple strategies to overcome challenges in the educational system by reforming it. Her current research is focused on the governance of science granting councils in Africa and the funding of research in Africa.

== Works ==
Moja has authored 3 books focusing on higher education policies and their reformation in South Africa. She used global perspectives to understand how South Africa links up with the point about defying exceptionalism, so that South Africa can fruitfully scrutinize international experiences in the book titled Higher Education Policy, Institutions and Globalization: New Dynamics in South Africa After 1994. She further looked into the progress of reform in higher education institutions in the Eastern Cape of South Africa in National Policy and a Regional Response in South African Higher Education, which was written in association with Partnership for Higher Education in Africa in the form of case studies.

In the book, Transformation in Higher Education – Global Pressures and Local Realities, Moja presented the changes occurring in South African higher education and research following the 1994 democratic elections, focusing on the post-Apartheid era of South African higher education. Frans van Vught remarked "This book addresses a rich variety of issues on South African higher education. It puts these in the relevant context of the process of globalization and it shows that the South African experiences offer us a lot to learn. Highly recommended for those who are intrigued by the innovations taking place in South African higher education as well as for those who intend to grasp the effects of globalization."

=== Higher education issues in African higher education institutions ===
Moja researched higher education policy and strategies for its improvement throughout her career. She examined the process of higher education policy development in post-apartheid South Africa from 1994 to 1998, and determined that while there was a national consensus on certain education policy principles, such as access and quality, debates persisted on issues like governance structures and institutional autonomy. In a report published for the World Bank in 2000, she analyzed the performance and challenges faced by the Nigerian education sector and emphasized that major educational transformations are needed which require the collaboration of different institutions within the country.

Moja explored the transformation of higher education in South Africa, particularly focusing on the tensions between equity, efficiency, and development in the policy-making process, and identified that these tensions have arisen due to the interplay of macro, social and economic processes, historical legacies, and policy decisions, emphasizing the need for prioritization and attention to different aspects of these tensions for effective policy implementation. She also addressed the challenges and inequalities present in South African higher education institutions, particularly the lack of moral and political legitimacy in historically white institutions and the limited academic credibility in many black institutions, and underscores the pressing need for reforms to rectify these issues and promote greater relevance, accountability, and democracy in the higher education system. In addition, she introduced a distinction between administrative and political forms of control and proposed a more nuanced understanding of state control and supervision based on inter-organizational coordination and regulation.

=== Internationalization of higher education ===
Moja's research has also included the global changes in higher education brought about by internationalization. She investigated the challenges faced by higher education institutions in the 21st century, and highlighted the need for institutions to redefine their roles in a globalized world and emphasized the necessity for new types of institutions that can effectively address global challenges and contribute to sustainable development at a global level. She also explored the impact of the pandemic on international students, teaching, research, and funding-related issues, highlighting the efforts made to normalize activities through central command instructions and guidance, allowing the academic year to be completed despite disruptions.

=== Educational technology and academic development ===
Moja investigated the use of technology in educational and academic development for teaching. She researched the pedagogical concerns encompassing access, quality, teaching, learning, and research in distance and cyberspace education and analyzed the gender-related aspects specifically within the realm of cyberspace education in South Africa. Moreover, she addressed the educational challenges faced by South Africa during a transitional period and explored the potential of educational technology in facilitating effective learning for students, teachers, and the broader community. The findings highlighted the dire conditions in some township schools, with instances of vandalism and destruction, expressing concerns about the persistence of such issues in the new South Africa.

== Awards and honors ==
- 1982 - 1985 - Fulbright Scholarship
- 2019 – Lifetime Achiever Award, National Research Foundation
- 2021 – Honorary Doctorate, University of Pretoria

== Bibliography ==
=== Books ===
- Higher Education Policy, Institutions and Globalization: New Dynamics in South Africa After 1994 (2002)
- National policy and a Regional Response in South African Higher Education (2004) ISBN 9780852554357
- Transformation in Higher Education – Global Pressures and Local Realities (2006) ISBN 9781402061790

=== Selected articles ===
- Moja, T., Cloete, N., & Muller, J. (1996). Towards new forms of regulation in higher education: The case of South Africa. Higher education, 32(2), 129–155.
- Moja, T., & Hayward, F. M. (2000). Higher education policy development in contemporary South Africa. Higher Education Policy, 13(4), 335–359.
- Cloete, N., & Moja, T. (2005). Transformation tensions in higher education: Equity, efficiency, and development. Social Research: An International Quarterly, 72(3), 693–722.
- Moja, T., & Hayward, F. M. (2005). The changing face of redress in South African higher education (1990-2005). Journal of Higher Education in Africa/Revue de l'enseignement supérieur en Afrique, 31–56.
- Moja, T. (2021). National and institutional responses–reimagined operations–pandemic disruptions and academic continuity for a global university. Studies in Higher Education, 46(1), 19–29.
