= Baker Congregational Church =

Historic church in Massachusetts, United States

- U.S. National Register of Historic Places
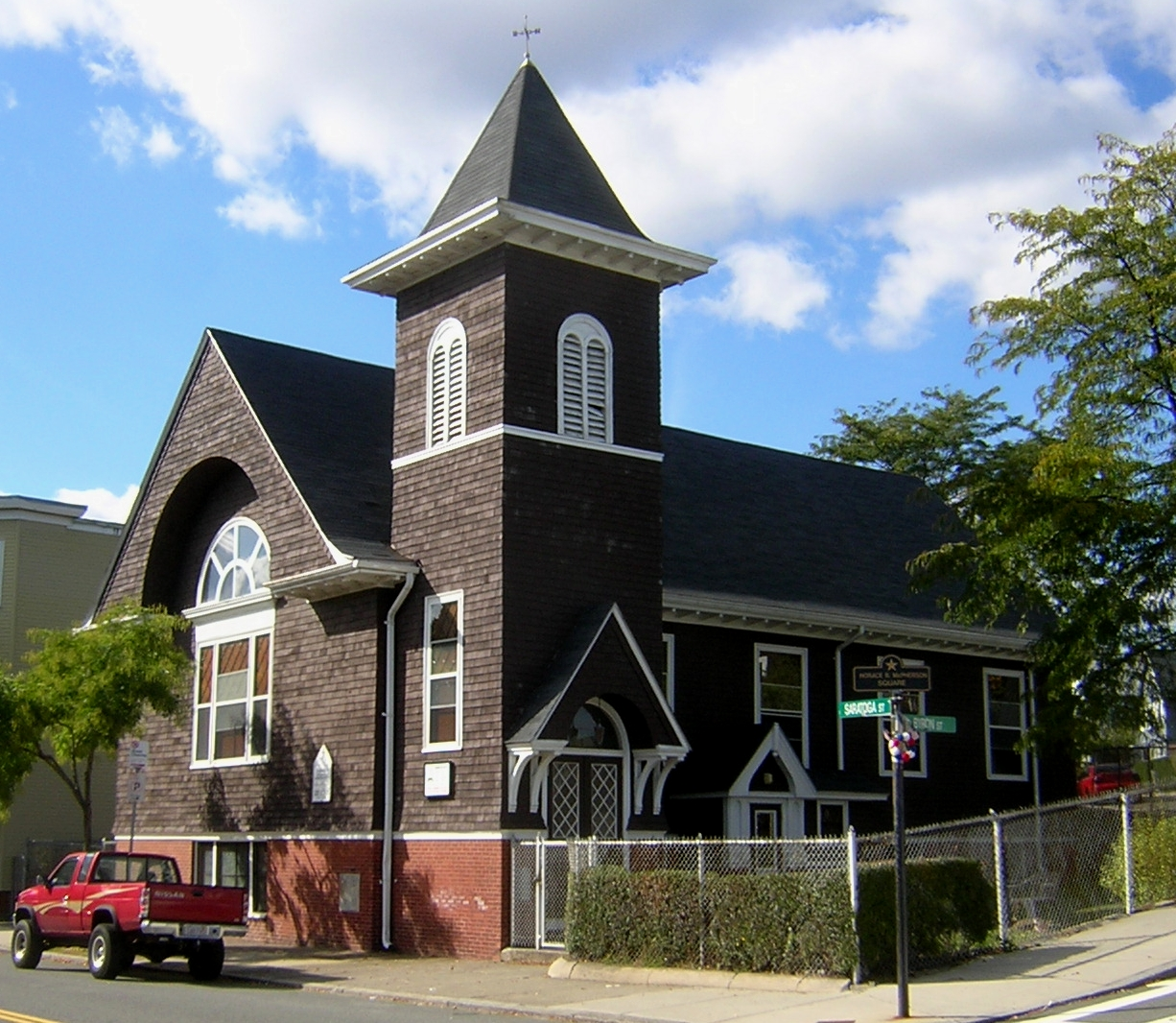
- View of the church from the corner of Saratoga and Byron St.

- Location within Massachusetts
- Location: 760 Saratoga St. East Boston, Massachusetts
- Coordinates: 42°23′2″N 71°1′1.5″W
- Area: 0.22 acres (0.089 ha)
- Built: 1903
- Built by: John N. Thisland; F. W. Woollcott
- Architectural style: Shingle style
- NRHP reference No.: 98001381
- Added to NRHP: November 19, 1998

The Baker Congregational Church is a historic Congregational church at 760 Saratoga Street in East Boston, Massachusetts.

== History ==
With the growth of East Boston as a settlement in 1834, a need was seen for a church and meetinghouse for the inhabitants. The church was founded under the name First Congregational Church in East Boston, which on July 7, 1837, was changed to Maverick Congregational Church by the Society's majority shareholders. First located in a Federal-style meetinghouse at the corner of Maverick and Havre Streets, the church moved in 1844 to a Gothic Revival edifice at the corner of Sumner Street and Maverick Square, before settling into a larger Gothic Revival structure in Central Square in 1875. Meanwhile, a second church had been established on November 17, 1852, as the Maverick Church Chapel by the Maverick Congregational Society on land given by the East Boston Company. That chapel too moved more than once before the construction of the current structure on the corner of Byron and Saratoga streets in 1903, eventually being renamed as the Baker Congregational Church.

The Maverick and Baker churches merged in the mid-20th century to form Baker-Maverick Congregational Church, and then merged again with the two Episcopal parishes of St. John's (formerly on Lexington Street) and St. Andrew's, completing the merger in 1949. Today the church is known as Grace Church Federated. The 1903 shingle style church building built by John Nelson Thisland and F. W. Woollcott was added to the National Register of Historic Places in 1998.

== See also ==
- National Register of Historic Places listings in northern Boston, Massachusetts
