= Edward O. Shaw =

American fighter ace

Edward Oliver Shaw
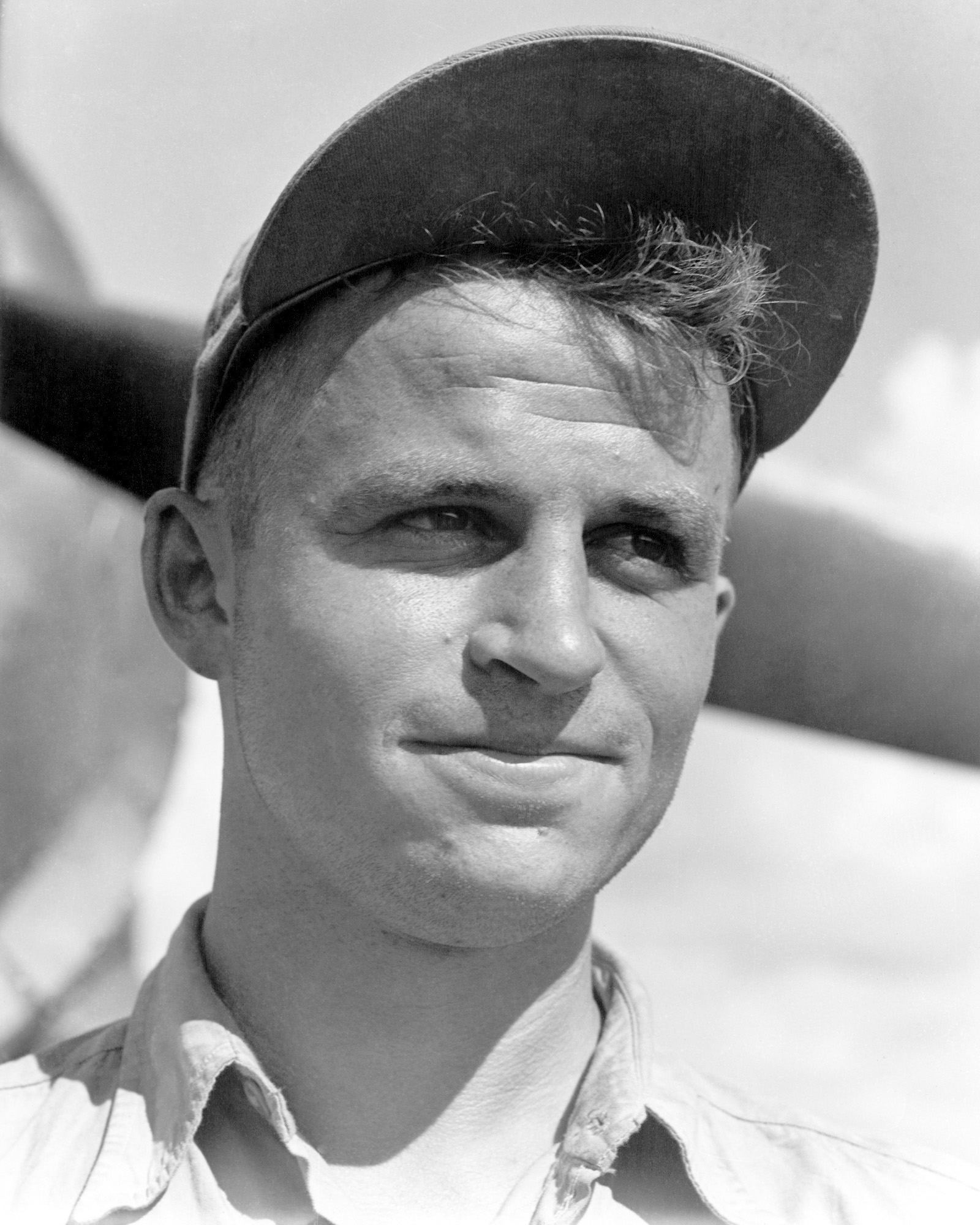
- Born: 20 January 1920; Bloomer, Wisconsin
- Died: 31 July 1944 (aged 24); Mojave Desert, California
- Military career
- Allegiance: United States
- Branch: United States Marine Corps
- Service years: 1942 - 1944
- Rank: Captain
- Conflicts: World War II
- Awards: Distinguished Flying Cross (2)

Edward Oliver Shaw (20 January 1920 – 31 July 1944) was a Marine Corps flying ace during World War II, credited with taking out 13 enemy aircraft. He was awarded the Distinguished Flying Cross and reached the rank of captain before he was killed during a test flight in California.

== Education ==
Shaw graduated from West Valley High School, and then attended Washington State college for one year.

== Aerial combat missions ==
During a combat sortie in 1943 Shaw was engaged by Zeros while protecting friendly dive bombers. Shaw shot down one enemy plane and also managed to destroy two float planes before the mission was over. For this and other actions he was awarded the Distinguished Flying Cross and was publicly lauded for his combat missions in the Pacific. On another combat sortie the same year, he and his flight intercepted eight enemy bombers, and he shot down two of them, as well as claiming a third by working together with another pilot.
