= Ed Shaw (activist) =

American activist (1923–1995)

- Born: Edward Walter Shaw; July 13, 1923; Zion, Illinois, U.S.
- Died: November 9, 1995 (aged 72)
- Education: Illinois Institute of Technology
- Occupation: Activist
- Political party: Socialist Workers

Edward Walter Shaw (July 13, 1923 – November 9, 1995), better known as Ed Shaw, was an American socialist and lifelong member of the Socialist Workers Party.

== History ==
Shaw was born in Zion, Illinois in July 1923 and grew up in a family of working farmers. In his youth, he rebelled against the fundamentalist religious assumptions that surrounded him in Zion. After high school, at the outbreak of World War II, he entered the Illinois Institute of Technology in Chicago. Shaw moved to New York City in 1942. There, while still in his late teens, he entered the military-run Maritime Service training school at Sheepshead Bay, where he got his papers as a fireman/watertender in the merchant marine.

On his way to start a job on a boat on the Great Lakes in 1943, Shaw found himself helping a Black worker escape a racist lynch mob during a race riot in Detroit - an act that ended up marking the rest of his life. From that moment on, he identified with, and later became an active participant in, the struggle for Black rights. During World War II, Shaw sailed mostly on what were called "liberty ships." While in Murmansk, in the Arctic region of the Soviet Union in 1943, on a ship carrying arms and supplies, Shaw got his interest piqued in socialism.

A few months later, on a ship in a Philadelphia harbor loading cargo for the USSR, Shaw met a seaman who had gotten to know a member of the Socialist Workers Party on another trip. This seaman told Shaw that 18 leaders of the SWP and the Minneapolis Teamsters had been imprisoned on charges of "conspiring to advocate the overthrow of the U.S. government," because of their opposition to World War II. Their convictions had been the first under the notorious Smith Act. As a result, Shaw joined the Socialist Workers Party in October 1944 and later served in the Army during the Korean War.

After the Cuban Revolution in 1959, Shaw travelled to Cuba to experience what was going on first hand. Upon Shaw's return, the SWP sponsored a nationwide speaking tour for him in late 1959 and 1960. In the early 1960s, he was a leader and Midwest director of the Fair Play for Cuba Committee.

In 1964, Shaw was nominated as the Socialist Workers candidate for U.S. vice-president and ran on the ticket with Clifton DeBerry. The SWP slate got on the ballot in 11 states. Shaw assumed additional leadership responsibilities over the next decade. He became SWP organization secretary in 1965, an assignment he held through 1968.

During much of the 1970s, Shaw shouldered numerous responsibilities as a leader of the world Trotskyist movement. He traveled throughout Latin America, collaborating with cothinkers of the SWP and other revolutionaries. Shaw also represented the SWP leadership as a fraternal delegate in the United Secretariat of the Fourth International between 1972 and 1977 and spent considerable time in Spain.

In 1977 Shaw moved to Miami and became part of the SWP branch there. After retiring from day-to-day political activity in 1982, he continued to follow the party's press and its work nationally and internationally, and to carry out projects proposed by the party leadership.

Shaw worked as a machinist for 11 years at an aircraft engine shop, before retiring in 1992 at the age of 69. Shaw was hospitalized in October 1995 with complications from chronic emphysema and serious heart problems. He died four weeks later on November 9, at the age of 72.

Preceded by Myra Tanner Weiss	Socialist Workers Party nominee for Vice President of the United States; 1964	Succeeded by Paul Boutelle
