= Edward Richard Shaw =

American writer

- Born: 1855; Bellport, NY
- Died: 1903 (aged 47–48); Yonkers, NY
- Resting place: Bellport, NY
- Occupation: Educator
- Known for: Children's Books

Edward Richard Shaw (1855–1903) was a Professor and Dean, New York University, and author of numerous books, primarily children's schoolbooks.

Shaw was born in 1855 at Bellport, New York (part of Long Island). His undergraduate work was at Lafayette College, and he received his Ph.D. from New York University. After serving as Principal at Sayville, New York; Greenport, Suffolk County, New York; and Yonkers (NY) High School, he became Professor of Pedagogy in the New York University. By the time of his death, he was Dean.

Some of Shaw's output consisted of famous works edited for use by schoolchildren; examples include Black Beauty and Joshua Slocum's Sailing alone around the world.

== Works ==
Shaw Edward Richard The Pot Of Gold Belford, Clarke and Co. Chicago IL 1888

- Shaw, Edward R. (1901). School hygiene. New York: The Macmillan Co. OL 7076039M.
- Shaw, Edward R. (1890). Development of the drama.
- Shaw, Edward R. English Composition and Practice. Holt.
- Shaw, Edward R. (1889). Inventional geometry.
- Shaw, Edward R. (1900). Discoverers and explorers. New York: American Book Company.
- Shaw, Edward R. Physics.
- Shaw, Edward R. Geography.
- Christie, Sarah Row; Edward R. Shaw (1903). Pathways in nature and literature: A second reader. New York: University Publishing Company. p. 1.
- Shaw, Edward R. (1900). Big people in other lands.
- Shaw, Edward R. (c. 1895). Legends of Fire Island Beach and the South Side. New York: Lovell, Coryell & Co.
- Sewell, Anna. Edward R. Shaw (ed.). Black Beauty.
