= Susan Mohl Powers =

American contemporary artist and sculptor (born 1944)

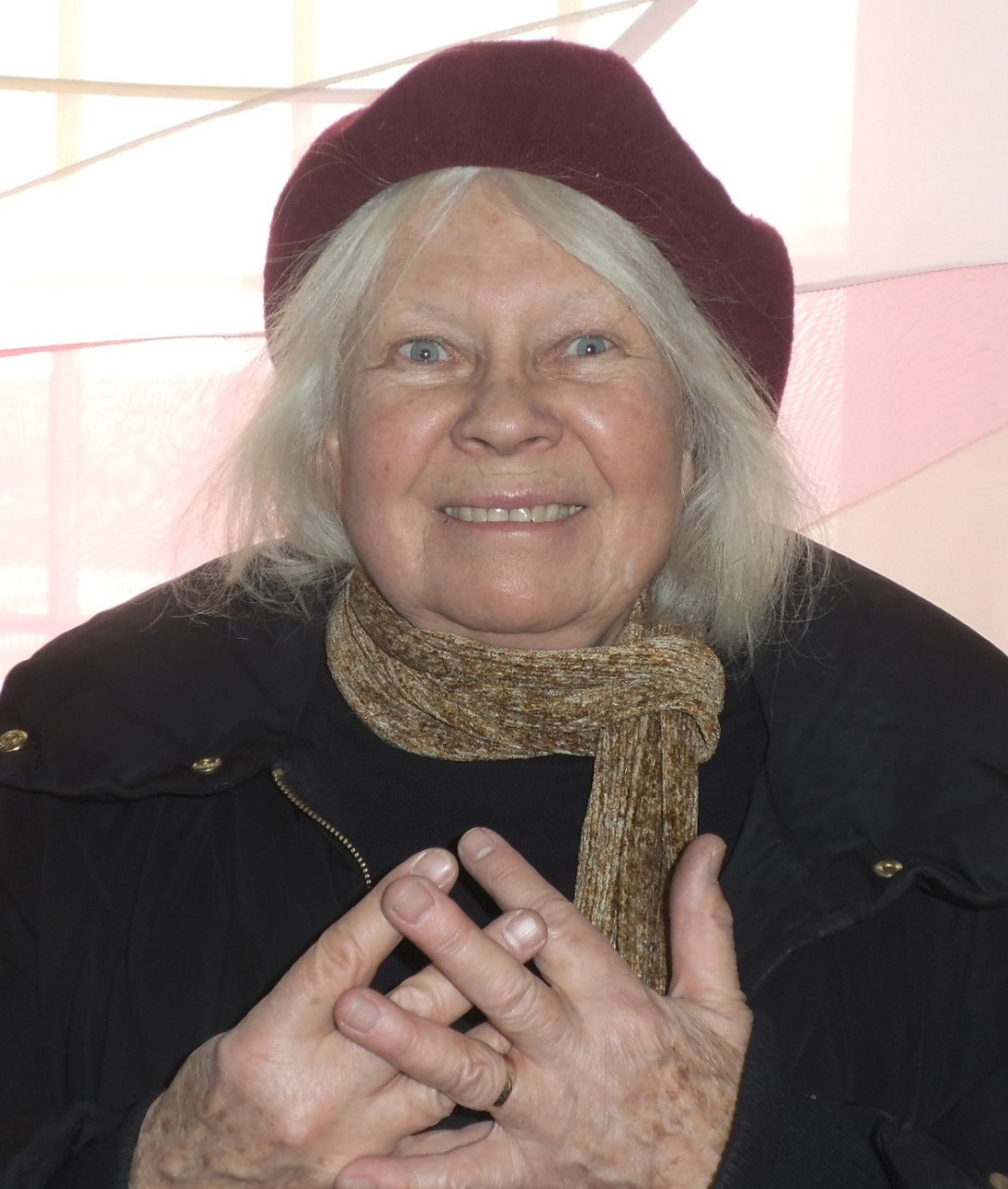
- Born: Susan Elizabeth Mohl; June 1, 1944; Saint Paul, Minnesota
- Died: October 24, 2023 (aged 79); Fall River, Massachusetts
- Education: Mount Holyoke College; University of Minnesota
- Occupations: Artist; Sailshade Studios owner
- Known for: Sculptures and paintings that blend art and science; Sailshades
- Spouse: Alan W. Powers
- Children: Two daughters
- Website: sailshadestudios.com

Susan Mohl Powers (1944 – 2023), born in Saint Paul, Minnesota, was a contemporary artist who sculpted in polygon and planar metal as well as sewn fabric, blending art and science to design sculptures and fabric-on-canvas paintings. The owner of Sailshade Studios in Fall River, Massachusetts, she also designed, trademarked and fabricated an energy-efficient window shade.

== Biography ==
Susan Mohl Powers, daughter of Judson Jasper Mohl and Florence (née Kling) Mohl, was born in Saint Paul, Minnesota, of Swedish ancestry. Her family lived in Kansas and also in New England, where she completed high school. She married Alan W. Powers in 1966. They lived in Westport, Massachusetts.

Her interests in science and mathematics shaped her approaches to art. As a child she was fascinated by fossils; as an undergraduate, she conducted public open houses at Mount Holyoke College observatory. Powers was also a science teacher at a private school in Minnesota. Her early artistic influences included Buckminster Fuller and D'Arcy Wentworth Thompson's On Growth and Form.

Powers died October 24, 2023, in Fall River, Massachusetts.

== Education ==
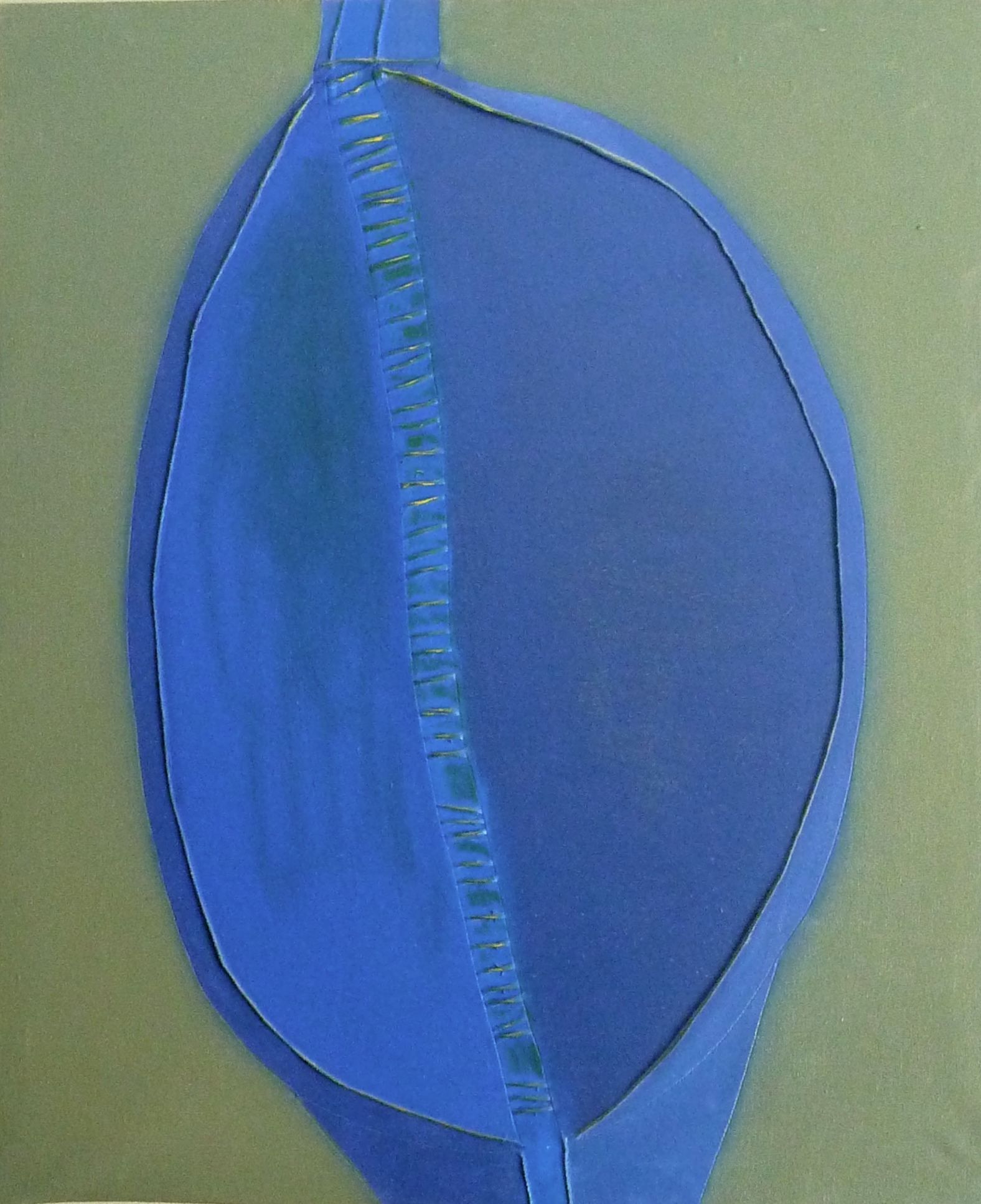
Redwood Seed by Susan Mohl Powers

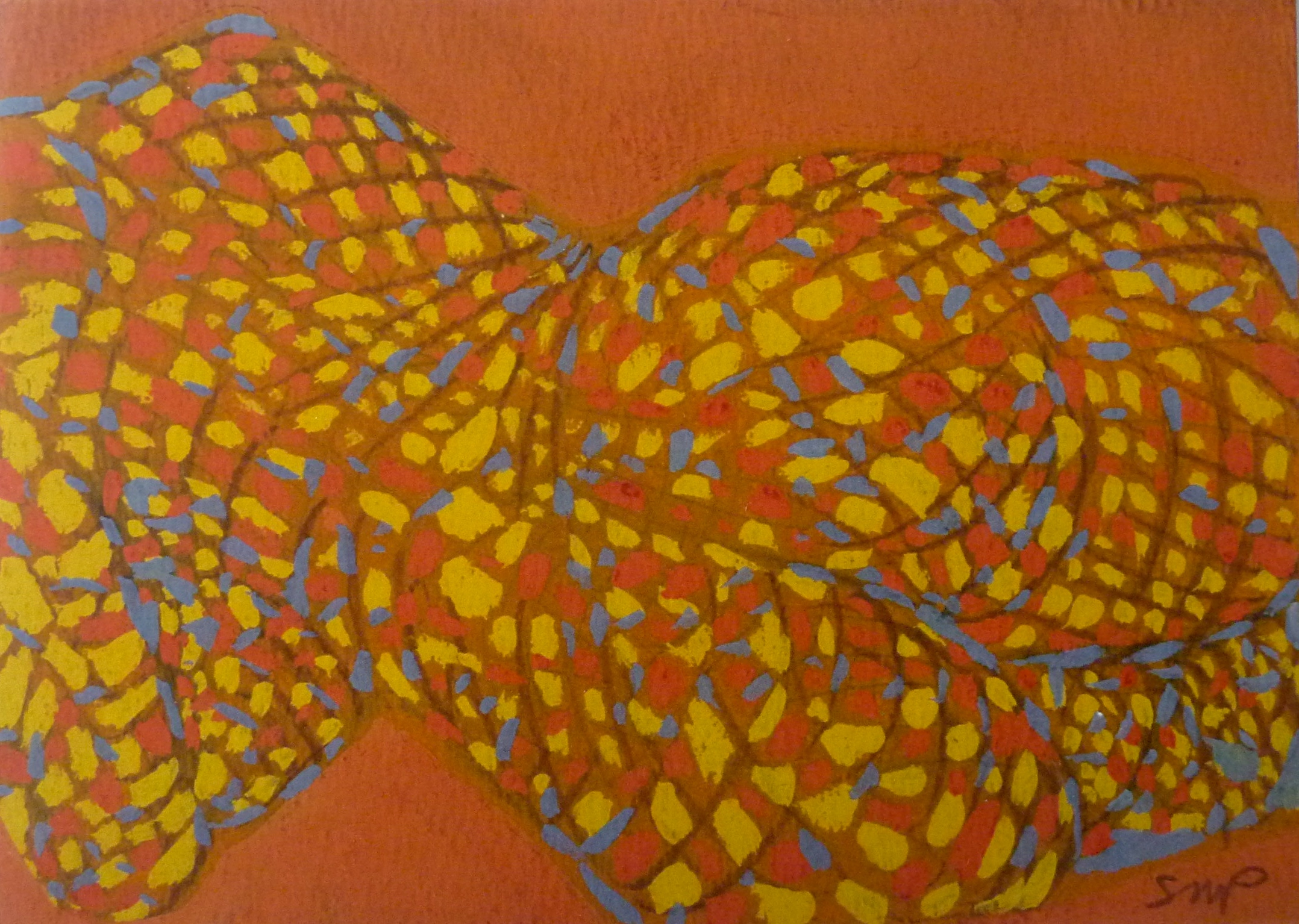
Mosaic Nude by Susan Mohl Powers

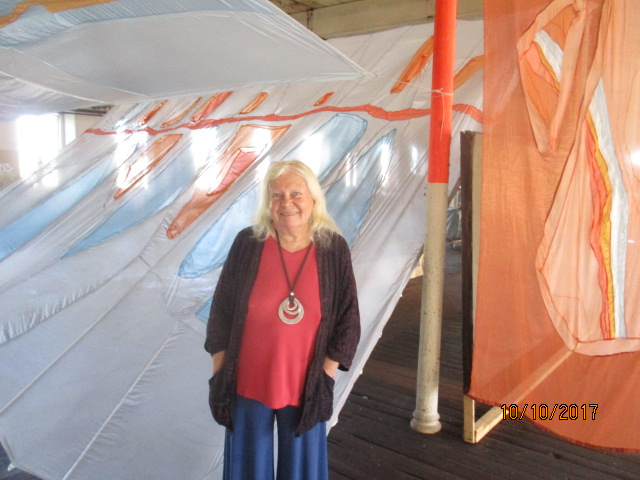
Susan Mohl Powers with two of many large pieces exhibited at Squibb International Headquarters, Princeton, NJ, 1979, reviewed in the Times, "Blending Science and Art."

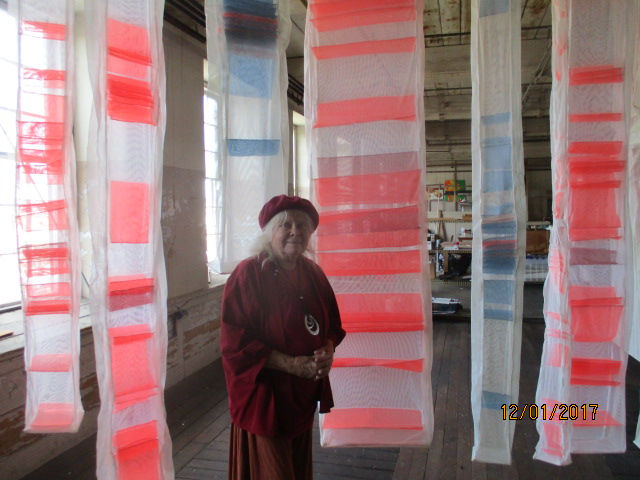
Susan Mohl Powers in Sailshadestudios, Fall River, MA, with pieces from her Nemasket show (Fairhaven) in 1988. It has since exhibited at Heritage Park, Fall River.

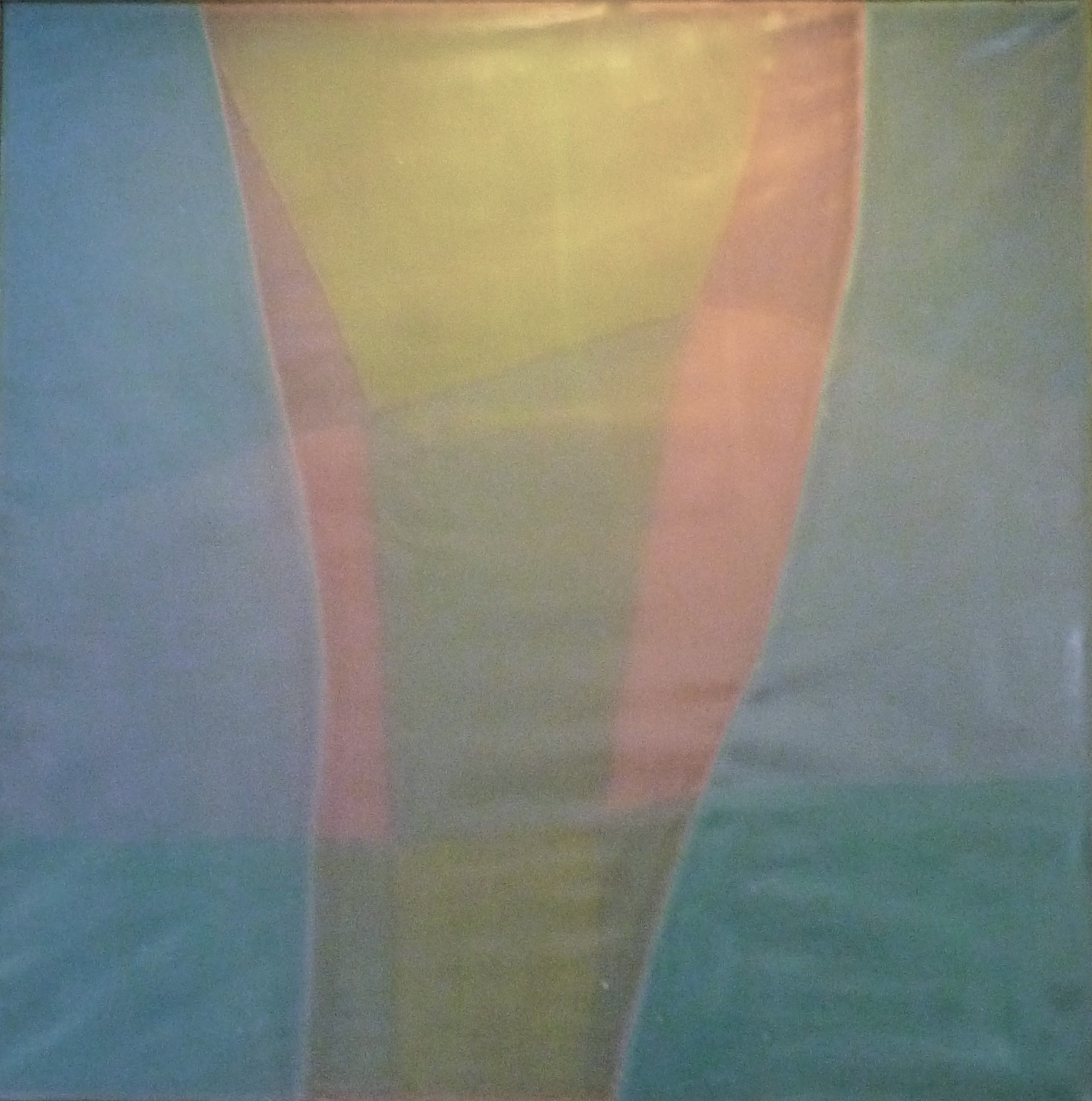
Fabric Glass Blue Rose by Susan Mohl Powers

Powers earned a baccalaureate in 1966 from Mount Holyoke College, having studied studio art, physics, and astronomy. She began her Master of Fine Arts in sculpture at the University of Minnesota, and completed a Master of Fine Arts in visual design in Massachusetts. She studied with Henry Rox, Jānis Kalmīte, Hui Ming Wang, Leonard DeLonga, and Harold Pattek. Early in her career, she created welded steel sculptures under Katherine Nash, who founded Katherine E. Nash Gallery at the University of Minnesota.

Powers wrote that her art was an effort to record imagery from scientific studies and observations: "I now see cellular and fossil-like forms everywhere. The expression might be a fabric sculpture. It might be an oil painting in which ribbed structures are sewn into the canvas before stretching. It might be works on paper; when I draw pastel nudes, the thighs, the breasts, and the torsos all break apart into geometric, refracted patterns of the expanding universe."

== Reception ==
Powers' fine art abstracts and commercial fabrications were well received. A 1979 New York Times reviewer wrote that some modern artists are "able to create successful mixtures of science and art. The mixtures by Susan Mohl Powers, now on view at the Squibb Gallery, are fascinating, relying heavily on both disciplines for their expression." Acknowledging that a few pieces "might not be eminent successes", the review described most of her pieces as "striking for their adventurousness and for their emphatic presence... What makes these pieces interesting from an esthetic point of view is their apparent contradictory nature. One look might tell us that they are an Expressionist canvas using geometric shapes as imagery. Another look might tell us that they are soft sculpture. In fact, they work well as both."

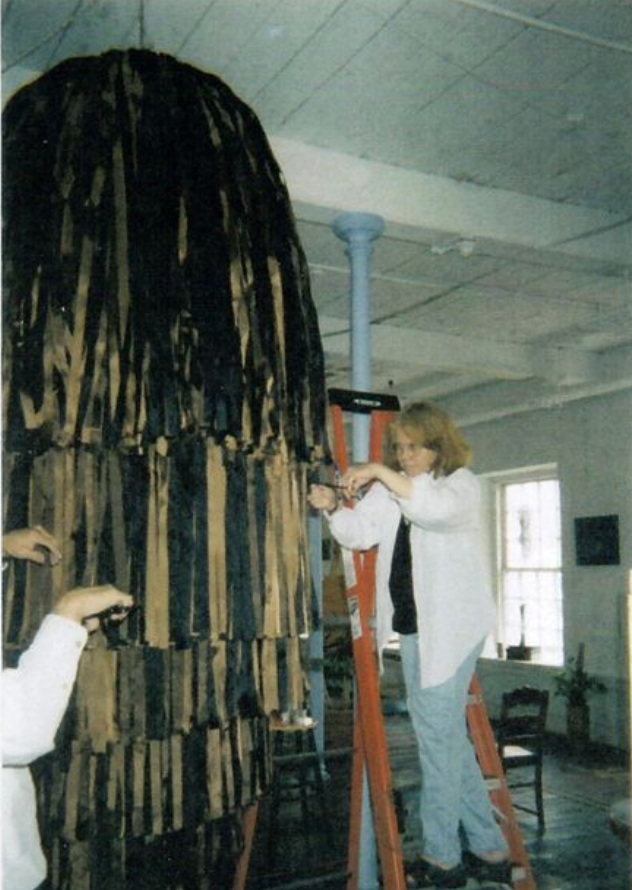
Susan Mohl Powers with Lion's Tuft for Claes Oldenburg

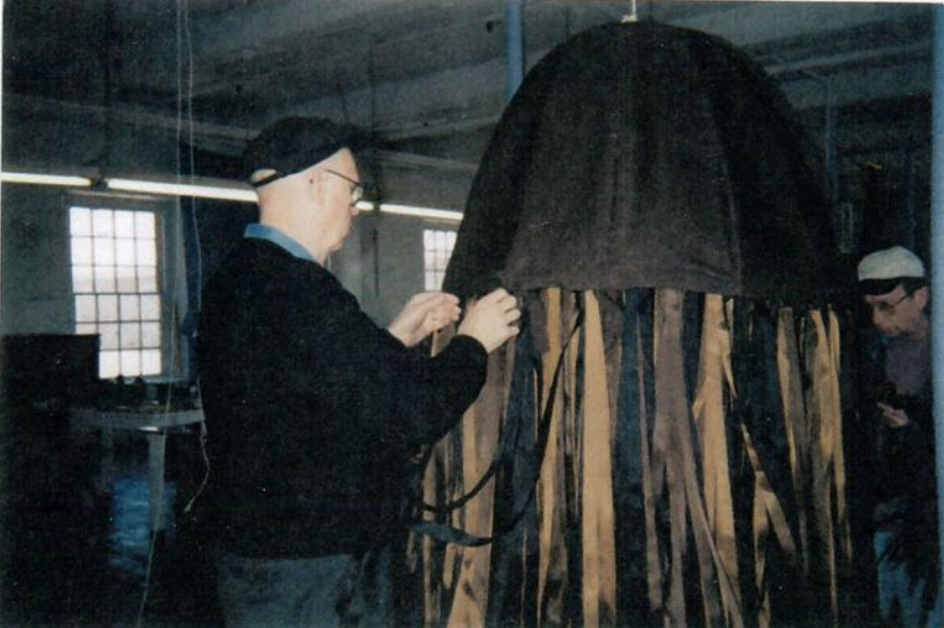
Claes Oldenburg at Sailshade Studios

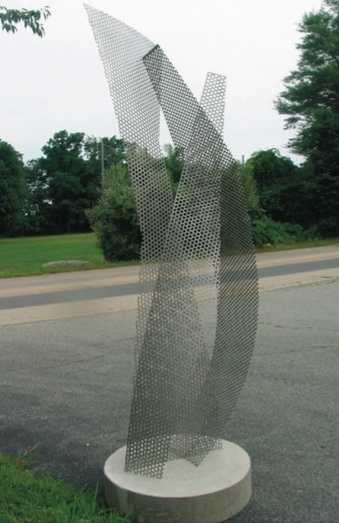
Dancing Galaxies by Susan Mohl Powers

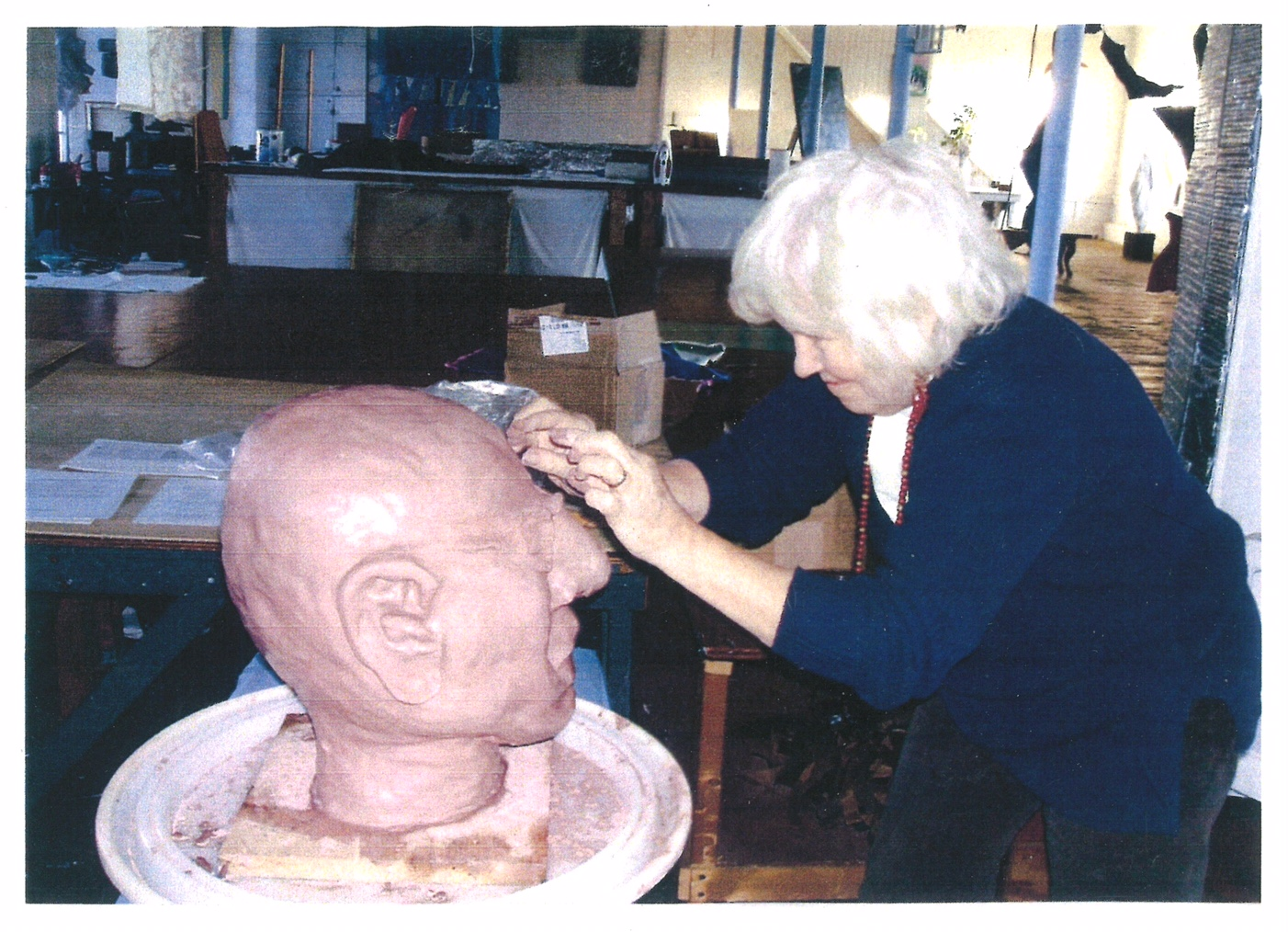
Susan Mohl Powers creating bust of Theodore Baird

A Boston Globe review described her solo installation of soft sculptures at the Nemasket Gallery in Fairhaven as "a series of gauzy, boxy fabric shapes suspended from the ceiling and moving gracefully in the air currents". It also highlighted her commercial ventures with Sailshades, and commented the artist "capitalized on the big open space by creating a series of sewn rectangles that, when hanging, stay open without folding or flopping, even though there is no armature other than the seams". The review mentioned layers of translucent materials and stitching lines: "The effect can resemble crazy quilt patterns, or ice floes cracking apart."

A 2003 reviewer observed, "Referencing skeletons and membranes and animals and insects, her suspended works appear to float weightlessly despite their sometimes-large size and volume", and noted that sections of a wall piece "appear to freeze differing fragments of cascading liquid waves movement".

== Sailshade Studios ==
Powers designed and began fabricating an energy-efficient "insulating decorator roman shade with a self-creating valance" out of her home in 1979, trademarking the name and design Sailshade in 1984 with her husband under the business name "Cloth Construction Partnership". By 1987, with diminishing sales, Powers took a job at a fabric mill and joined the International Ladies Garment Workers Union, which she later saluted with a large installation, "Under the Microscope of Spirit–A Tribute To The I.L.G.W.U.", at Nemasket Gallery in Fairhaven, Massachusetts.

In 1991 she opened Sailshade Studios, Inc., in Durfee Union Mills, a granite 1860 textile mill complex in Fall River, Massachusetts. Powers installed Sailshades in 32 states, created applications to address acoustic challenges, and installed heat-reducing "planar net artwork" in other venues. She also conducted do-it-yourself workshops locally in Massachusetts on making insulated shades that cut energy costs. The Sailshade trademark was re-registered in 2008 under "Sailshade Studios, Inc."

== Collaborations ==
As a subcontractor for Paul Amaral, Powers fabricated the 9 ft (2.7 m) tuft for Claes Oldenburg and Coosje van Bruggen's Venice Biennale piece, "Lion's Tale", a gift Oldenburg and van Bruggen installed originally May–October, 1999, in Piazza San Marco outside Museo Correr, Venice, Italy (now at Musei Civici Veneziani in Venice).

Powers directly collaborated with Paul Amaral in 2014 to fabricate the 9 ft (2.7 m) perforated stainless steel sculpture, "Dancing Galaxies".

Powers collaborated on three public sculpture installations with architect Kathryn Duff of the Studio to Sustain, Inc., of New Bedford, Massachusetts: at Butler Hospital in Providence, Rhode Island; Prima Care in Fall River, Massachusetts; and The Incognito restaurant in New Bedford, Massachusetts.

In collaboration with her husband, who wrote Birdtalk: Conversations with Birds, Powers provided chapter drawings to help readers identify birds whose calls are being described.

== Exhibitions and installations ==
Powers' résumé includes solo and group exhibitions, as well as public installations.

=== Solo exhibitions ===
- 1979 – "Polygons and Planar Nets," Squibb Gallery, Princeton, New Jersey
- 1988 – "Under the Microscope of Spirit–A Tribute To The I.L.G.W.U.", Nemasket Gallery, Fairhaven, Massachusetts; with immediate follow-up exhibition at Heritage State Park, Fall River, Massachusetts
- 1994 – Digital Corporation, Worcester, Massachusetts
- 1994 – Piano Mill Gallery, Needham, Massachusetts
- 1995 – Sterling Millworks Gallery, Sterling, Massachusetts
- 2002 – "Solo Exhibition 2002", Galleria Eclettica, Milano, Italia
- 2004 – New Bedford Art Museum, Lower Vault and Upper Vault Gallery

=== Selected group exhibitions ===
- 1971 – Kramer Gallery, St. Paul, Minnesota
- 1975 – Image Gallery, Lenox, Massachusetts
- 1994 – Donovan Gallery, Tiverton, Rhode Island
- 1998 – Virginia Lynch Gallery, Tiverton, Rhode Island
- 2003 – "Sun Spots 2003" and "Juno's Corset 2003", Grimshaw Gudewicz Art Gallery, Fall River, Massachusetts
- 2005 – Annotazioni d'Arte, Milano, Italia

=== Public installations ===
- 1991−1997– Children's Hospital, Boston, Massachusetts
- 1984 – Banners for Boston Ballet's world premiere performance of Choo San Goh's Romeo and Juliet, Wang Center, Boston, Massachusetts
- 1994−2008 – Fall River Government Center, Fall River, Massachusetts
- 2003 – "Seahorses 2003", Prima Care Lobby, Fall River, Massachusetts
- 2004−2008 – Incognito restaurant, New Bedford, Massachusetts
- 2004−present – "Fifteen Walls of Bas Reliefs", Butler Hospital, Providence, Rhode Island
- 2006−2009 – The Back Eddy restaurant, Westport, Massachusetts
- 2009 – Children's National Medical Center, Washington, D.C.
- 2010−2012 – Fall River Planning Board, Fall River, Massachusetts

== Selected sculptures by Susan Mohl Powers ==
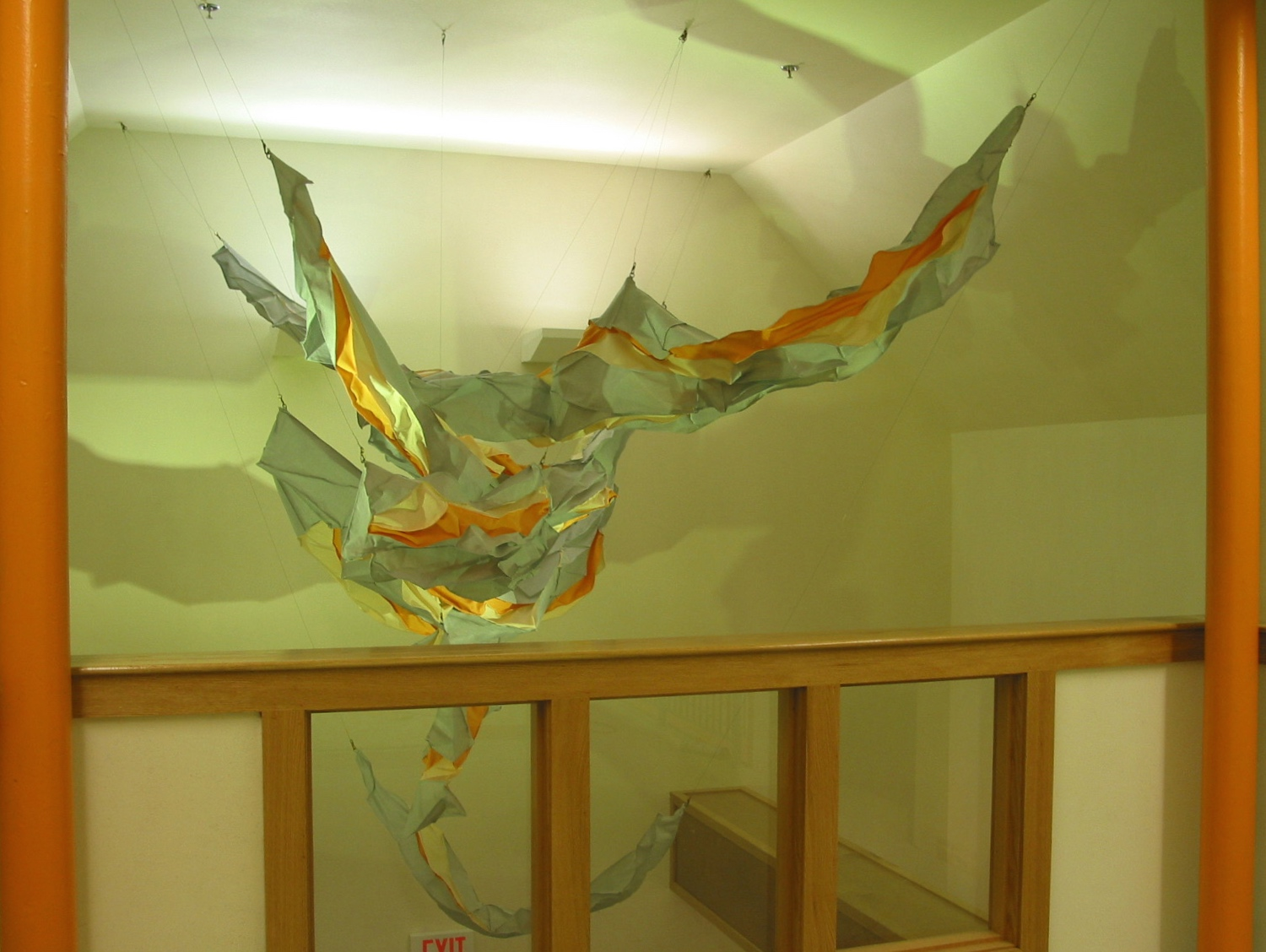
Seahorses
(viewed from balcony)
by Susan Mohl Powers

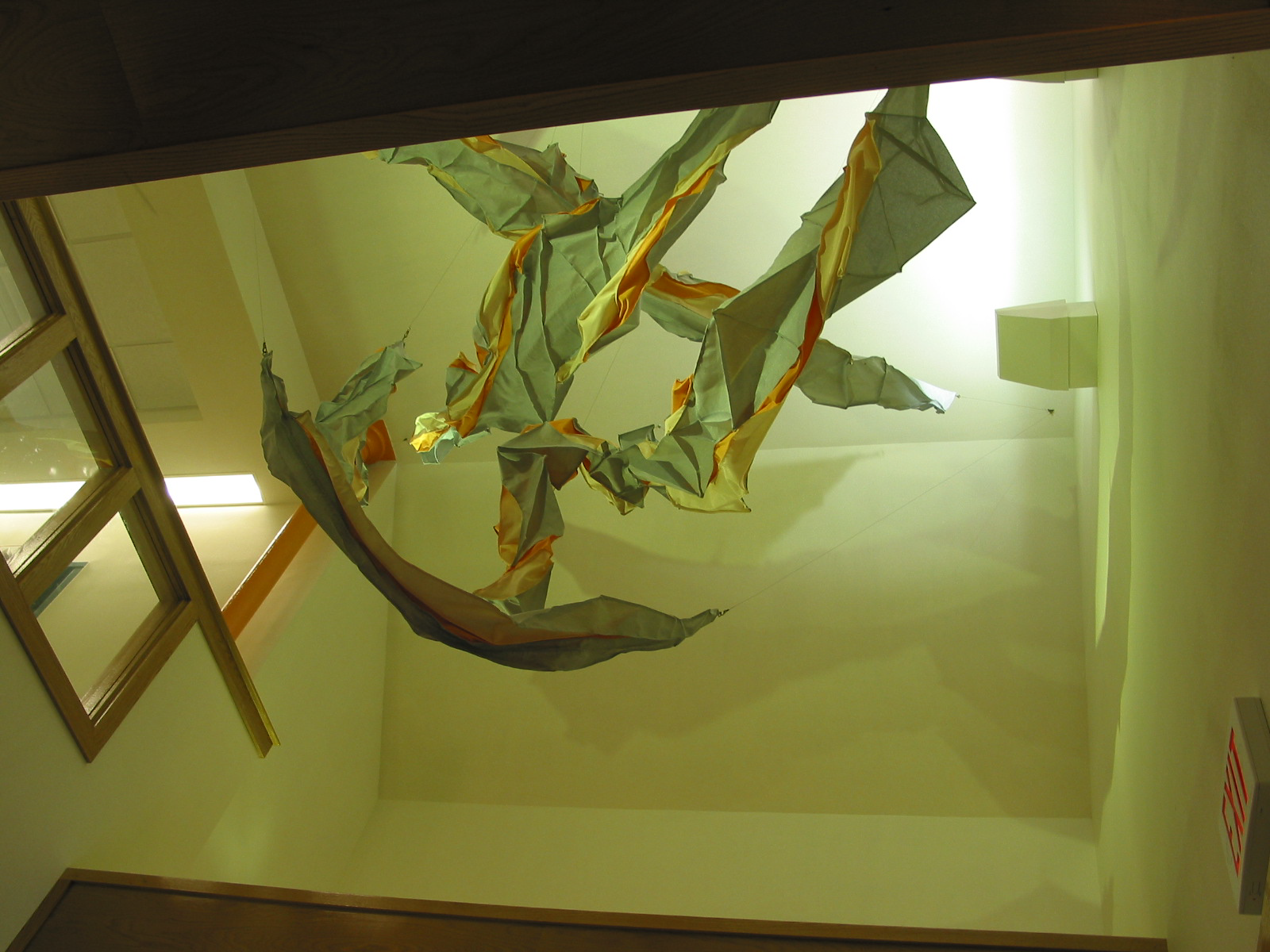
Seahorses
(viewed from below)
by Susan Mohl Powers

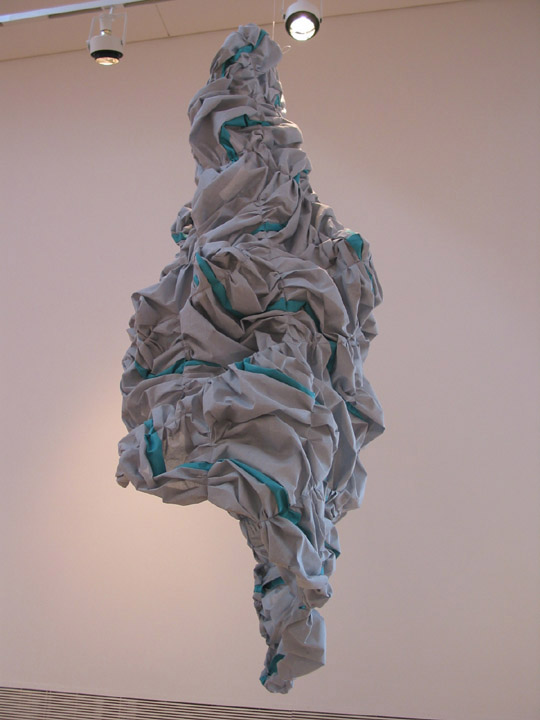
Juno's Corset
by Susan Mohl Powers

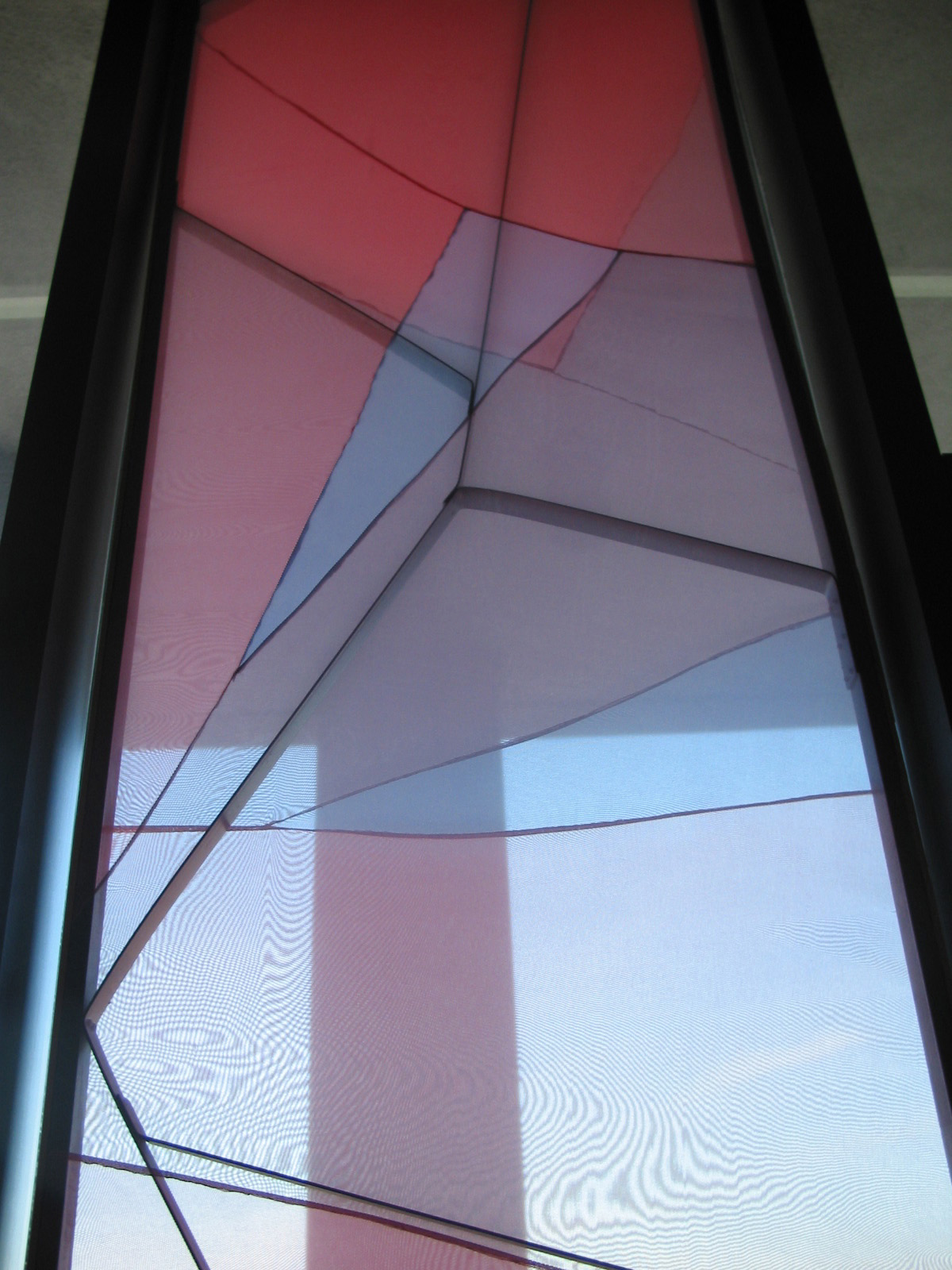
City Hall–red panel
by Susan Mohl Powers

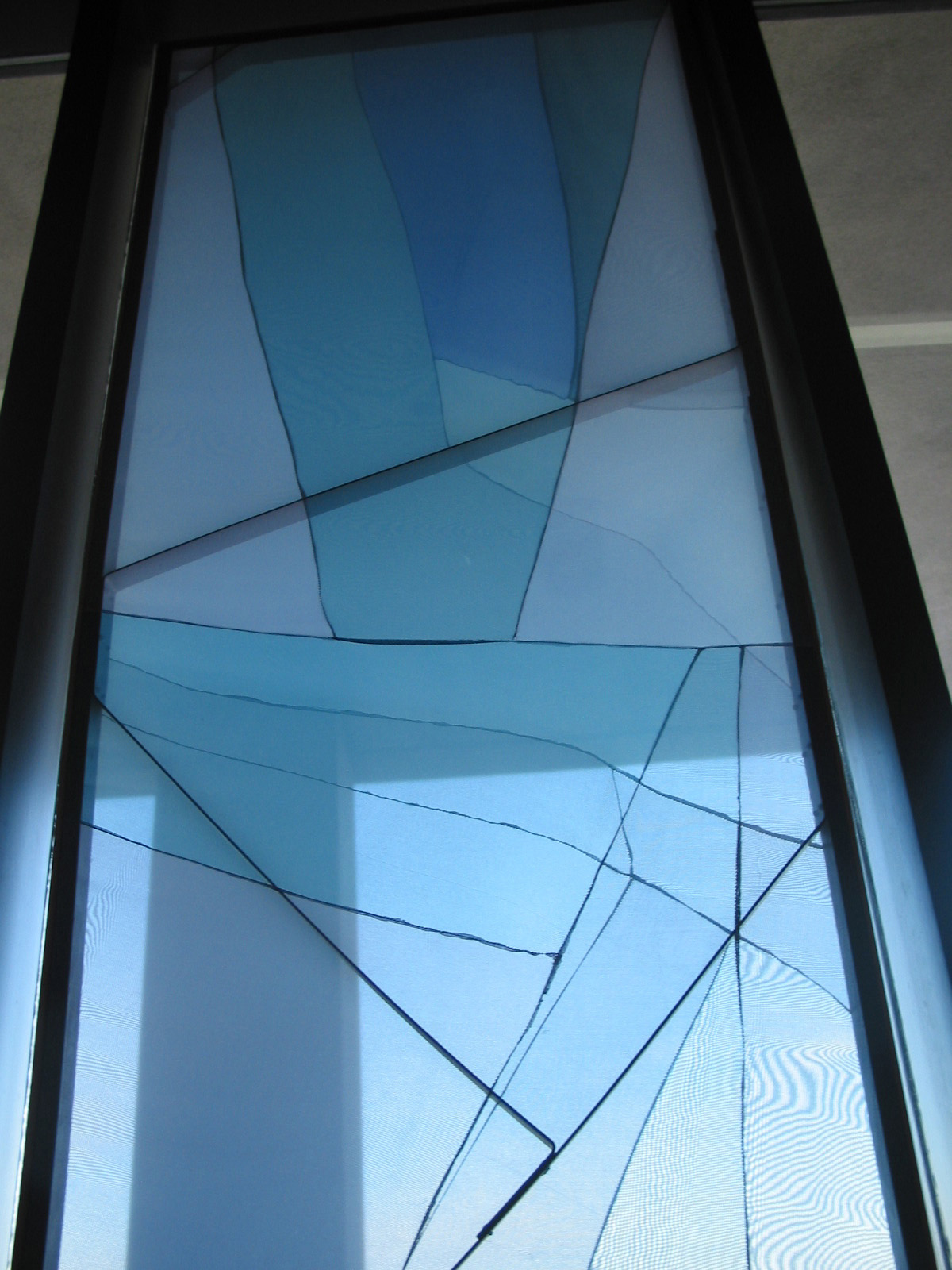
City Hall–blue panel
by Susan Mohl Powers

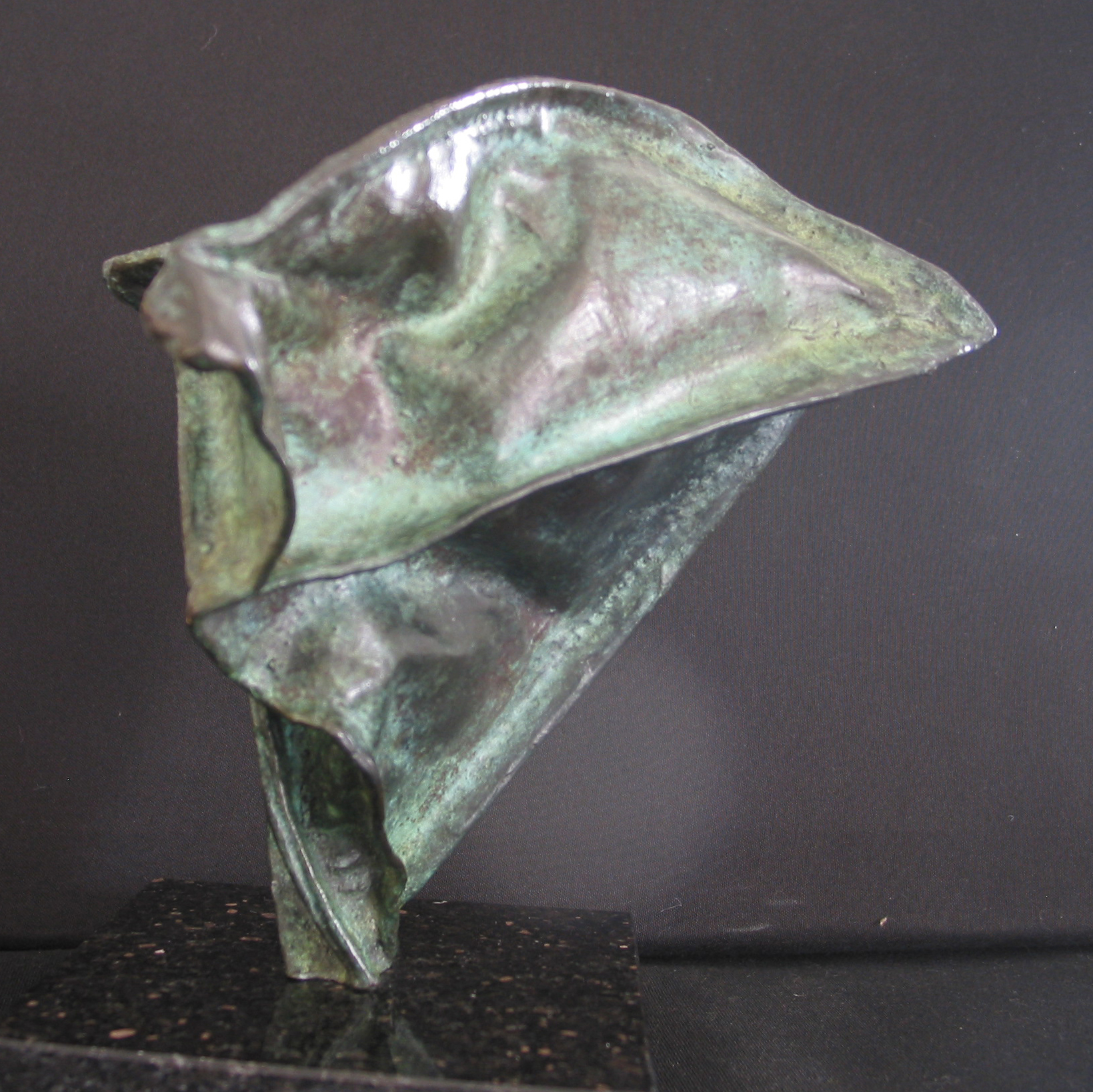
To Take Wing (bronze)
by Susan Mohl Powers

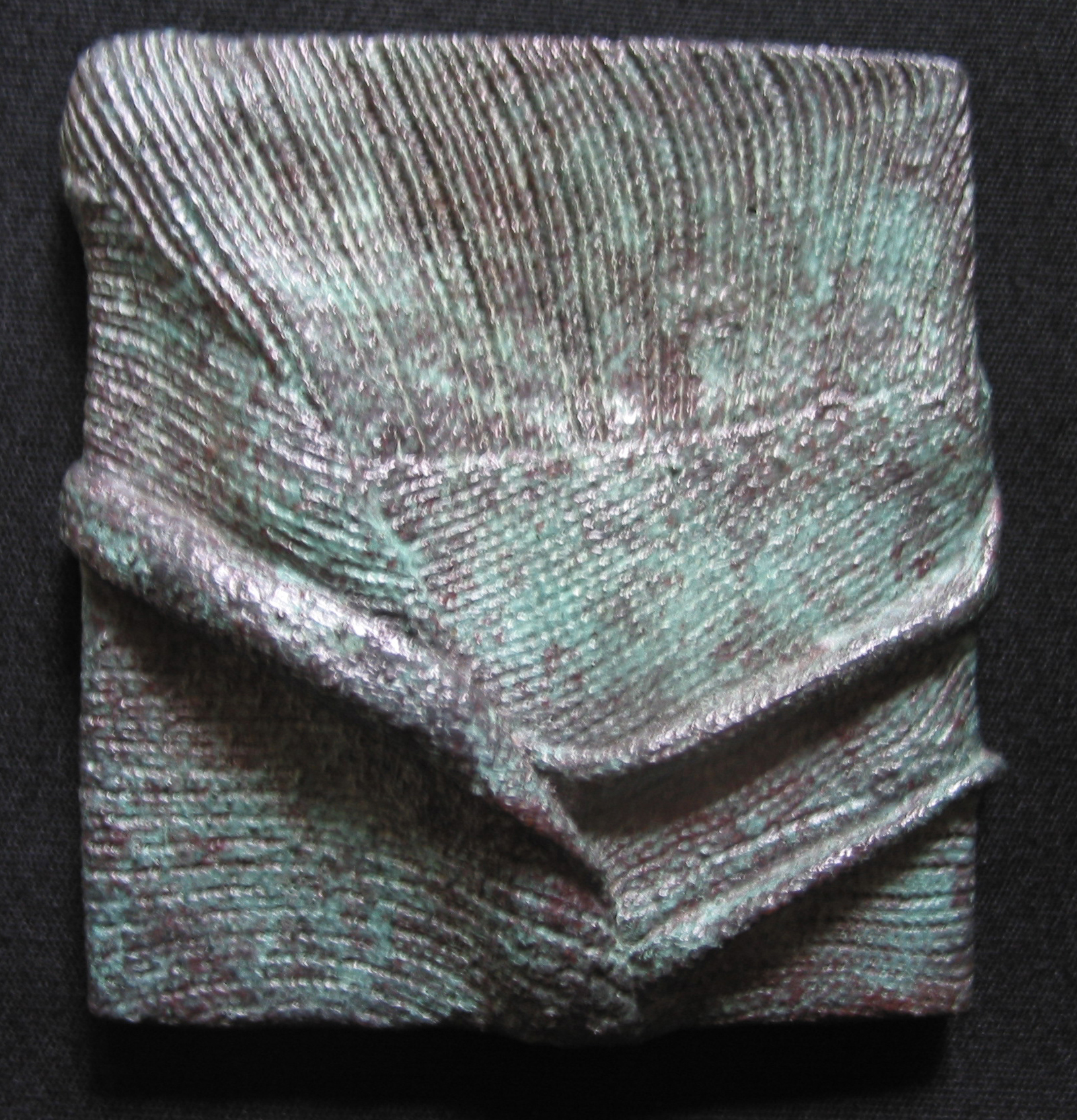
Fossil 473 (bronze)
by Susan Mohl Powers

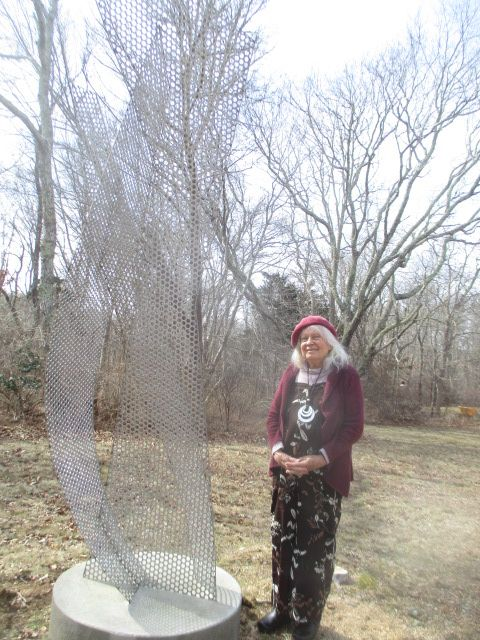
Susan Mohl Powers with Dancing Galaxies

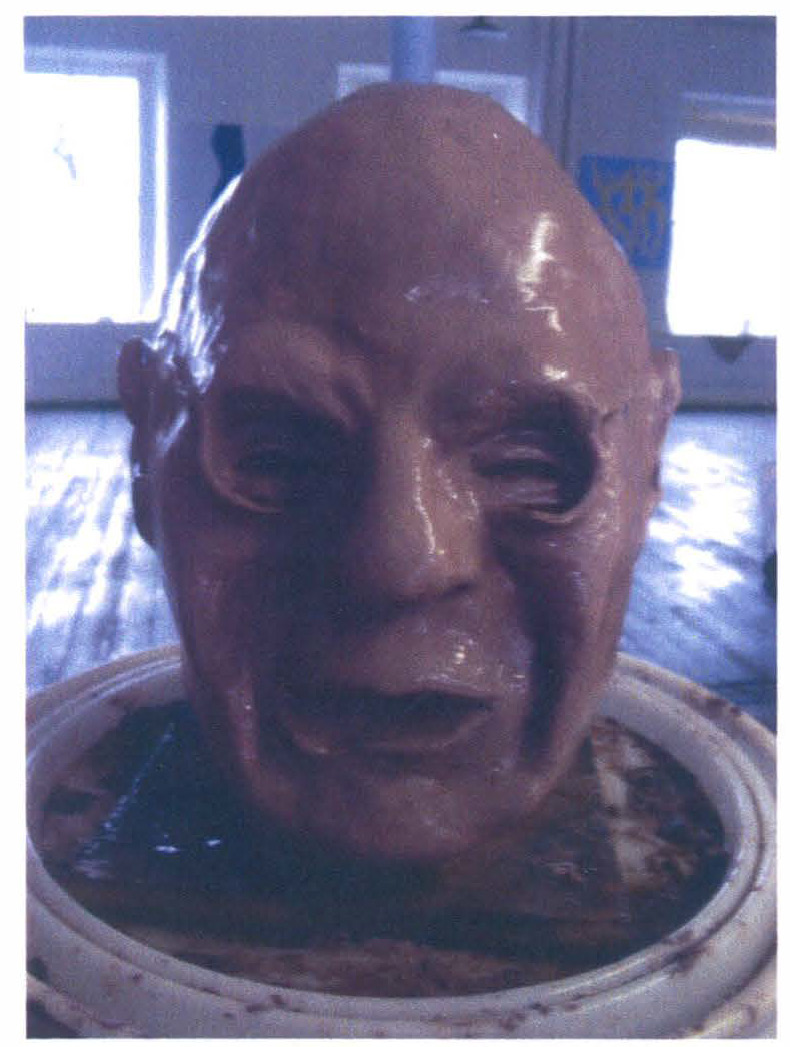
Bust of Theodore Baird, by Susan Mohl Powers
