= Alan W. Powers =

American academic and writer (born 1944)

- Portrait by Susan Mohl Powers
- Occupation: Retired college faculty

Academic background
- Education: B.A., Amherst College; Ph.D., University of Minnesota

Academic work
- Discipline: English scholar, academic and writer
- Institutions: Bristol Community College; Berkshire Community College

Alan W. Powers (born 1944) is an American academic and writer who has published on topics about Shakespeare, Renaissance law and folklore, and the songs of birds. In 2009 he was named Professor Emeritus of English at Bristol Community College, where he taught Shakespeare's works, western world literature, and poetry writing classes.

== Early life and education ==
The son of Roger Milton Powers and Ida Maxine Richardson, Alan Powers was born in Springfield, Massachusetts, in 1944.

Powers attended Classical High School in Springfield, Massachusetts, and East Longmeadow High School. He earned his bachelor's degree at Amherst College and married Susan Elizabeth Mohl in 1966. They had two daughters and four grandchildren.

Powers' 1976 Ph.D. dissertation at the University of Minnesota, This critical age: deliberate departures from literary conventions in seventeenth century English poetry, was advised by Leonard Unger.

== Career ==
Interviewer J. North Conway described Alan Powers as "...a poet, an author, a playwright, composer, and actor..." Powers studied with Archibald McLeish, who recommended him to a National Endowment for the Humanities program at Brown University.

Following his doctorate, Powers was on the faculty of Berkshire Community College and then on the faculty of Bristol Community College. Powers also completed postdoctoral appointments at "Princeton, Brown, Harvard, Cornell, the Folger Library, Breadloaf, Villa Vergilliana (Cuma, Italy) and the American Academy, Rome."

Powers served as chairman of the Bristol Community College English Department of from 1988 to 1992.

At Bristol Community College, Powers interviewed poet Elizabeth Bishop three times, and was described by Peggi Medeiros: "Alan is the author of Bird Talk and The World of Giordano Bruno. He also reviews concerts for the The Standard-Times... Alan was mentored by Rhoda Wheeler when he began teaching at BCC. He had been at two of Bishop's readings... His posting tied my favorite Bishop poem to Westport." Powers had written about Bishop's poetry:

"The art of losing isn't hard to master" was completed in Rhoda's Hurricane House where I interviewed Bishop on prosody. A few years later, I also cleaned a fish — a bluefish — for the author of "The Fish." —Alan Powers

Since 2011, Powers has contributed more than forty articles, letters, and obituaries to a variety of publications, including MSN UK, The Guardian, Yahoo Canada, Yahoo News UK, AOL UK, The Art Newspaper, The Architectural Review, Spiked, The Architects' Journal, The Herald News, Apollo — The International Art Magazine, Country Life, The Taunton Daily Gazette, Literary Review, Eye Magazine, The RIBA Journal, Crafts, Inkl, and Inner Power.

== Selected publications ==
=== Books ===

- Powers, Alan W. (1994). Westport Soundings. ISBN 978-1-58394-065-5. "When Kennedy dropped from the sky To honor the poet Frost, ... So MacLeish spoke... Not To mention Robert Frost. For Frost, Of course, is another matter, as he Always was, spoke to the throng and the one Hatless in October, but days before Dallas and November."
- Powers, Alan (2003). Birdtalk: conversations with birds. ISBN 978-1-58394-065-5. "Use caution when responding to birds. They do not possess the same instincts or impulses we inherit from our apelike forebears. For instance, keep your distance — say, thirty feet — when imitating a bird song. For most birds, twenty or thirty feet is roughly equivalent to a yard among humans. Closer than that, and you are up-close-and-personal, with the bird's urge-to-flee space. Don't talk to a nearby bird unless you can disguise yourself as a 20 gram ball of feathers."
- Powers, Alan (2010). The worlds of Giordano Bruno: the man Galileo plagiarised. ISBN 978-0-9549196-4-1. "Giordano Bruno was sent to the Inquisition, and its customary care of his soul, by one bad student evaluation.'"
- Powers, Alan W. (2014). Candelaio: A New Stage Translation. ISBN 1895537517. "Giordano Bruno was as modern in this play as in his universe filled with inhabitable worlds... But Bruno is downright funny in his play, as he is 'dead serious' in the works for which he died... Printed in Paris in 1582, the play waited four hundred years for the world to catch up to Bruno—not just in astronomy. Many know Giordano Bruno's martyrdom, but nobody thinks him outrageously funny, until they read this play..."
- Powers, Alan (2016). Parodies lost. ISBN 978-1-78697-512-6. OCLC 967057056. "We expect modern poets to confine themselves to their own psyches, even to avoid the wit, the humor that sustained poetry for centuries. But this poem ends in a revolt. Its tone changes..."
- Powers, Alan (2023). Conversations with birds: the metaphysics of bird and human communication. ISBN 978-1-59143-451-1. "I am no saint, but I do talk to birds... It is privileged communication, 'For ears only,' as government security might put it. It is a secret, an open secret. One thing I am at liberty to reveal. They want in to sports competition. Birds feel that we lesser great apes have for too long bathed in our own simian glory..."

=== Selected book chapters, articles ===
- Powers, Alan (2011). "Chapter 15. What he wills - Early modern rings and vows in Twelfth Night". In Schiffer, James (ed.). Twelph Night - New Critical Essays (1st ed.). doi:10.4324/9780203724576.
- Alan Powers (1994). "'Gallia and Gaul, French and Welsh': Comic Ethnic Slander in the Gallia War". In Teague, Frances (ed.). Acting Funny: Comic Theory and Practice in Shakespeare's Plays. Fairleigh Dickinson University. pp. 109–122. ISBN 978-0838635247.
- Powers, Alan W. (1988). "'Meaner Parties': Spousal Conventions and Oral Culture in Measure for Measure and All's Well That Ends Well". Upstart Crow2. 8: 28–41.
- Powers, Alan W. (August 9, 1987). "ON LANGUAGE; Head Over Googol". The New York Times (National ed.). p. 10, Section 6. ISSN 0362-4331.
- Powers, Alan W. "You Too Can Talk with Birds". InnerSelf. Archived from the original on May 16, 2025.

=== Letters to the editor ===
- Powers, Alan W. (April 9, 2010). "Emily Dickinson". Times Literary Supplement. No. 5584. p. 6. "...in response to Benjamin Markovits' article on author Emily Dickinson, in the March 19, 2010 issue."

=== Films ===
- Powers appeared in the 1986 Oscar nominated documentary-short subject that he helped write, Keats and His Nightingale.
- Powers was also in the 2005 Public Broadcasting Independent Lens productions, A Loaded Gun about Emily Dickinson, and Famous in the Neighborhood, about Cleveland poet Danny Thompson.

== Awards, honors ==
- National Endowment for the Humanities (NEH) program at Brown University.
- Professor Emeritus, Bristol Community College (2009)
