= Theodore Baird =

American college professor of English

Samuel Williston Professor of English Theodore Baird Emeritus
- Born: Theodore W. Baird; February 29, 1901; Warren Township, Trumbull, Ohio
- Died: December 29, 1996 (aged 95); Northampton, Hampshire, Massachusetts
- Occupation: College faculty member
- Known for: Creating Amherst's freshman composition course
- Title: Samuel Williston Professor of English

Academic background
- Education: Ph.D., 1929
- Alma mater: Harvard
- Thesis: The Life and Worlds of George Colman the Elder

Academic work
- Discipline: English literature

Theodore Baird (February 28, 1901 – December 29, 1996) was an American academic and Samuel Williston Professor of English, emeritus, at Amherst College. From 1927 to 1969 he taught students a wide range of literature, and was the creator of the English 1-2, the college's highly regarded freshman composition course.

Baird and his wife commissioned Frank Lloyd Wright to design their home, the Theodore Baird Residence.

== Early life and education ==
Theodor Baird, son of Silas and Emma (née Lane) Baird, was born in Warren Township, Trumbull, Ohio, on February 28, 1901. He completed his baccalaureate degree at Hobart College. In 1928 he married Frances Halliburton Titchenor, who was on the faculty of Smith College. Baird he earned a master's degree and a 1929 Ph.D. from Harvard University with his dissertation, The Life and Worlds of George Colman the Elder.

== Career ==
Before joining the Amherst faculty as an instructor, Baird taught briefly at Western Reserve University, Union College and Harvard. He joined the Amherst faculty in 1927 and retired in 1969.

Baird "...was the creator of the college's highly regarded freshman composition course", the subject of Robin Varnum's history of Baird's innovative techniques, Fencing with Words. Central techniques included the use of assignment sequences, the use of student writing as class texts, the insistence that students write from experience, the determination to have students recognize themselves as makers of meaning and then to assume responsibility for their work—all elements of writing classes that became important in the 1970s and have endured. Baird wrote very little about the course. His influence survives in the teaching and writing of colleagues and of colleagues' students. Citing a list given her by William Pritchard, Varnum names "William E. Coles, Jr., Roger Sale, Walker Gibson, Benjamin DeMott, William R. Taylor, Jonathan Bishop, John Butler, Richard Poirier, and Armour Craig," along with Pritchard himself as the teachers and Amherst alumni most influenced by Baird. She adds the name of Reuben Brower. She cites David Bartholomae as part of the second generation influenced by Baird. Bartholomae wrote his graduate dissertation in literature under the direction of Richard Poirier and went on to work with William Coles at the University of Pittsburgh.

Baird and his wife were interested in the architecture of Frank Lloyd Wright, and their Amherst "Usonian house", designed in 1939, was built in 1940 at a cost of $8000. It is the only Frank Lloyd Wright building in Massachusetts.

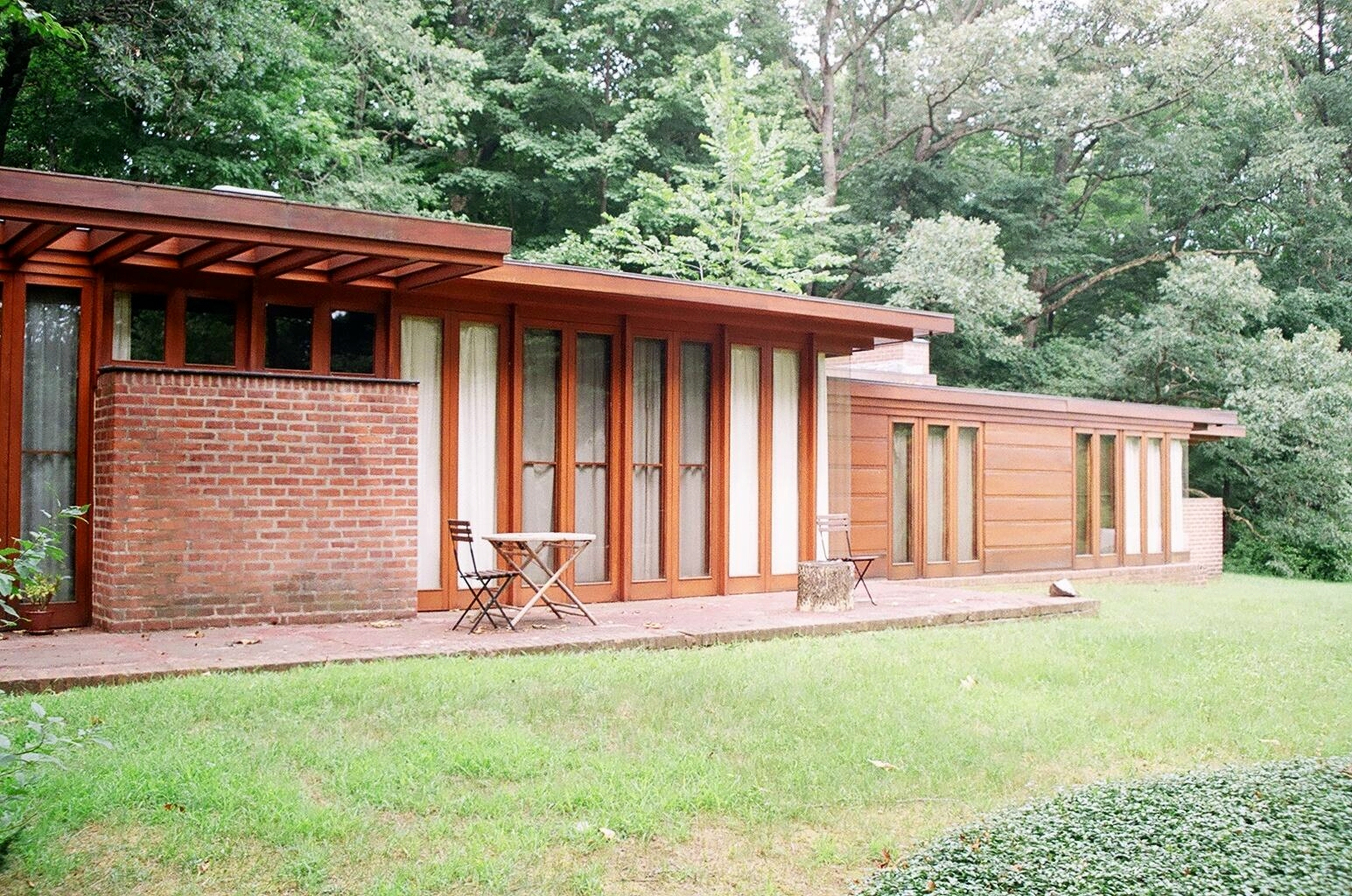
Theodore Baird residence

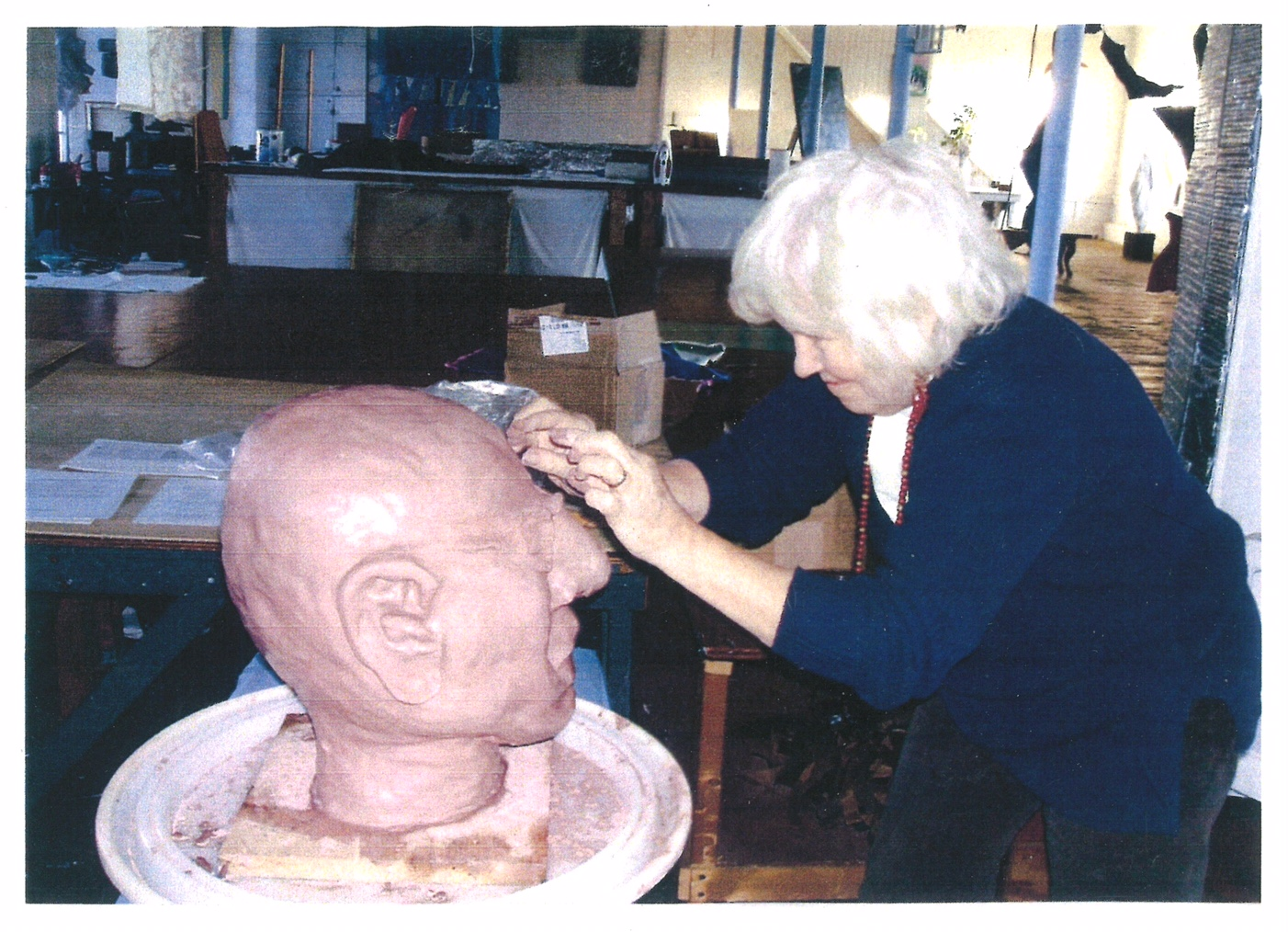
Bust of Theodore Baird, by Susan Mohl Powers

== Selected publications ==
- Baird, Theodore, ed. (1931). The First Years: Selections from Autobiography.
- Baird, Theodore (September 1936). "The Time-Scheme of Tristram Shandy and a Source". Publications of the Modern Language Association of America. 51 (3): 803–820. doi:10.2307/458270. ISSN 0030-8129.
- Baird, Theodore. (Autumn 1946) "Darwin and the Tangled Bank" The American Scholar, Vol. 15, No. 4, pp. 477–486 (10 pages) Publisher: The Phi Beta Kappa society.
- Baird, Theodore (April 1949). "Sympathy: the Broken Mirror." American Scientist, Vol. 37, No. 2, publisher: Sigma Xi, The Scientific Research Honor Society, pp. 255-261 (7 pages).
- Baird, Theodore (Spring, 1958). "The World Turned Upside Down,"The American Scholar, Vol. 27, No. 2, Phi Beta Kappa society, pp. 215-223 (9 pages).
- Theodore Baird. (published posthumously, July 1, 1999) Most of It, Essays on Language and the Imagination, William H. Pritchard, ed.
- Baird, Theodore (published posthumously, Fall 2002) "Try to Establish a Conversation: An Oral History" Theodore Baird, Writing on the Edge, Vol. 13, No. 1, pp. 97–112 (16 pages) Published By: Regents of the University of California, on behalf of its Davis University Writing Program.
- Baird, Theodore (published posthumously, 2005) English at Amherst: a history, William H. Pritchard, ed., Amherst College Press, 2005. 288 pp.

== Awards, honors ==
- Baird held the named professorship, Samuel Williston Professor of English.
- He became professor emeritus upon his retirement in 1969.
