= Theodore Baird Residence =

Historic house in Massachusetts, United States

- Baird House
- U.S. National Register of Historic Places
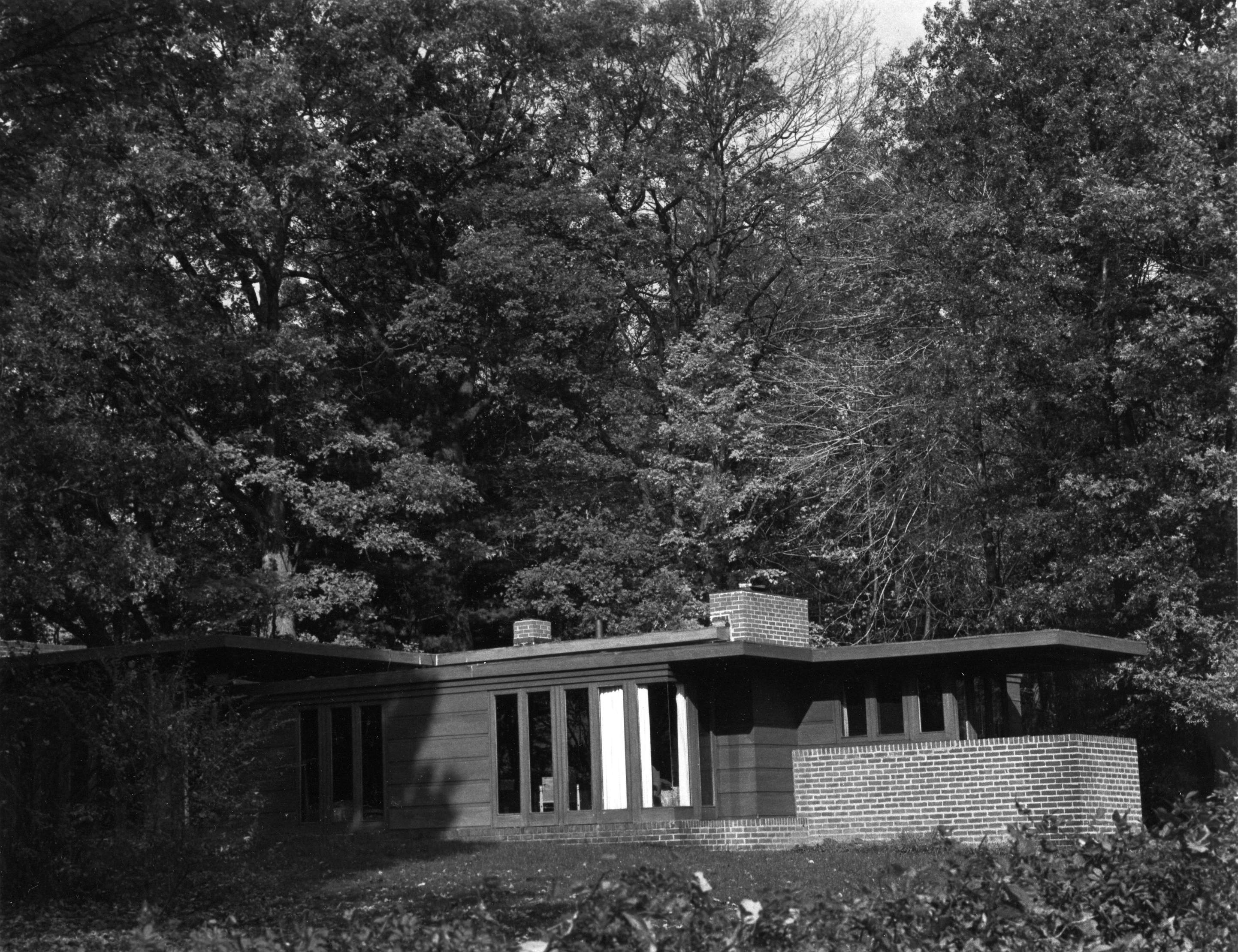
- photo c. 1984

- Location within Massachusetts Location within the United States
- Location: 38 Shays Street, Amherst, Massachusetts
- Coordinates: 42°21′1.29″N 72°31′5.58″W
- Built: 1940
- Architect: Frank Lloyd Wright
- Architectural style: Usonian
- NRHP reference No.: 85000026
- Added to NRHP: January 3, 1985

The Theodore Baird Residence, also known as Baird House, is a suburban house designed by American architect Frank Lloyd Wright, and located at 38 Shays Street in Amherst, Massachusetts, United States. It is the only Wright design in Massachusetts.

The Usonian house was planned and built in 1940 for Amherst College English professor Theodore Baird. The Bairds became interested in Wright's work after reading his autobiography, and submitted a commission to him. Wright produced drawings based on the Baird's description of their lifestyle and a description of the lot. They were unable to locate contractors in the area who were able to do the work, so the construction work was done by Wright protégé William Wesley Peters. Part of the construction work was done at a factory in New Jersey, and moved to Amherst for final assembly. The house was the only Usonian for which the materials were prefabricated before being brought to the site.

It is a single-family house with brick, cypress wood and glass façades and a flat roof highly cantilevered over a carport. Heating is conveyed by pipes distributing hot water through the concrete floor. There are also three fireplaces, one in the master bedroom and another with a single chimney and two grates which is divided by a partition wall separating the living room and study. The building includes an in-law apartment for Baird's mother, which is located at the opposite end of the house from the Bairds' quarters. Wright's design also included a dedicated space for the Bairds' dog, including a dog run and doghouse.

The house is set back about 250 feet (76 m) from the road. The property, which was listed on the National Register of Historic Places in 1985, also includes a 4-acre (1.6 ha) woodlot that extends behind the house and neighboring properties on Shays Street.

== See also ==
- List of Frank Lloyd Wright works
- National Register of Historic Places listings in Hampshire County, Massachusetts
