= Inkl =

inkl
- Company type: Private company
- Industry: Internet
- Founded: 2014; 11 years ago
- Founder: Gautam Mishra
- Headquarters: Australia
- Products: inkl app
- Website: inkl.com

inkl is a bundled news service. inkl was founded in 2014 by Gautam Mishra.

It provides access to bundled news sources for a fixed monthly fee.
