= Katherine Nash =

American artist and sculptor

Katherine E. Nash
- Born: Katherine Elizabeth Flink; 1910; Minneapolis, Minnesota, U.S.
- Died: 1982; Minneapolis, Minnesota, U.S.
- Known for: Computer art, Sculpture

Katherine Elizabeth Nash (1910–1982) was an American artist and sculptor best known for computer art and direct and arc welding. The Katherine E. Nash Gallery at the University of Minnesota Department of Art's Regis Center for Art bears her name.

== Family and early career ==
Katherine Nash was the daughter of Carl and Elizabeth Flink and sister of Alice Flink of Minneapolis, Minnesota. She studied at the Minneapolis School of Art, the university and the Walker Art Center School. While at Walker Art Center School, Katherine took courses in sculpture and painting techniques.

Katherine married attorney Robert C. Nash in 1934.

After Robert Nash, who worked for the U.S. federal government as a special investigator for the IRS's Enforcement Branch of Alcohol and Tobacco Tax, was transferred to Lincoln, Nebraska, Katherine was hired as an instructor at the University of Nebraska. She eventually became an assistant professor. While at the University in Lincoln, Katherine studied welding, foundry work, pattern making, and took jewelry classes. After Robert was transferred to Omaha, Nebraska in 1953, Katherine became head of the exhibitions program at the Joslyn Art Museum, while still continuing to teach at the university.

Katherine and Robert returned to Minneapolis in 1957. Katherine started teaching at the Minnetonka Center for the Arts. During the years of 1957 to 1963, both Robert and Katherine temporarily relocated, he - to Washington, D.C., she - to California, where she worked as a visiting professor at the San Jose State College for a semester. But in 1963, both Katherine and Robert returned to their home on St. Alban's Bay, Lake Minnetonka, near Excelsior, Minnesota.

Katherine and Robert didn't have children. In a 1976 interview, Katherine commented about her choice not to have children: "Personally, with the energies that I feel I have, I don't believe I could have been a successful mother and really worked on my art hard enough. It isn't that I wouldn't have tried."

== ART 1 ==
Rain Pattern, No. 3, Katherine Nash, 1969

In 1970, Nash then of the University of Minnesota and Richard H. Williams of the University of New Mexico published Computer Program for Artists: ART 1. The authors described three approaches an artist might take to use computers in art:

- The artist can become a programmer or software engineer
- Artists and software engineers can cooperate, or
- The artist can use existing software. At that time, ART 1 existed and she chose this path.

ART 1 output, like Rain Pattern, No. 3 from 1969, was an early example of not writing algorithms to produce art but of instead creating art with software.

Katherine's leading role in the creation of ART 1 and its successor, ART 2, is covered extensively in Sharing Code, by Patrick Frank.

== Galleries ==
In 1957 Nash was acting director of the University Gallery in Northrop Auditorium that became the Weisman Art Museum across Washington Avenue. From 1961–1976, Nash was professor of sculpture in the University of Minnesota Studio Arts Department, now the Department of Art, where she was known as Katy.

Nash lobbied the university for student exhibition space and in 1979 a gallery was founded in Willey Hall and administered by the student union. In 1992 the Department of Art became its supervisor and in 2003 moved the gallery to the Regis Center for Art.

== Collections ==
The Victoria and Albert Museum holds several artworks created by Nash in 1970 and 1971, using the ART1 and ART2 computer programs. Polar Coordinates was included in a V&A exhibition entitled Chance and Control: Art in the Age of Computers (2018).

Nash died in 1982 in Minneapolis. She was buried in Lakewood Cemetery.
