= Katherine E. Nash Gallery =

Art gallery at the University of Minnesota

Coordinates: 44.969172°N 93.242176°W

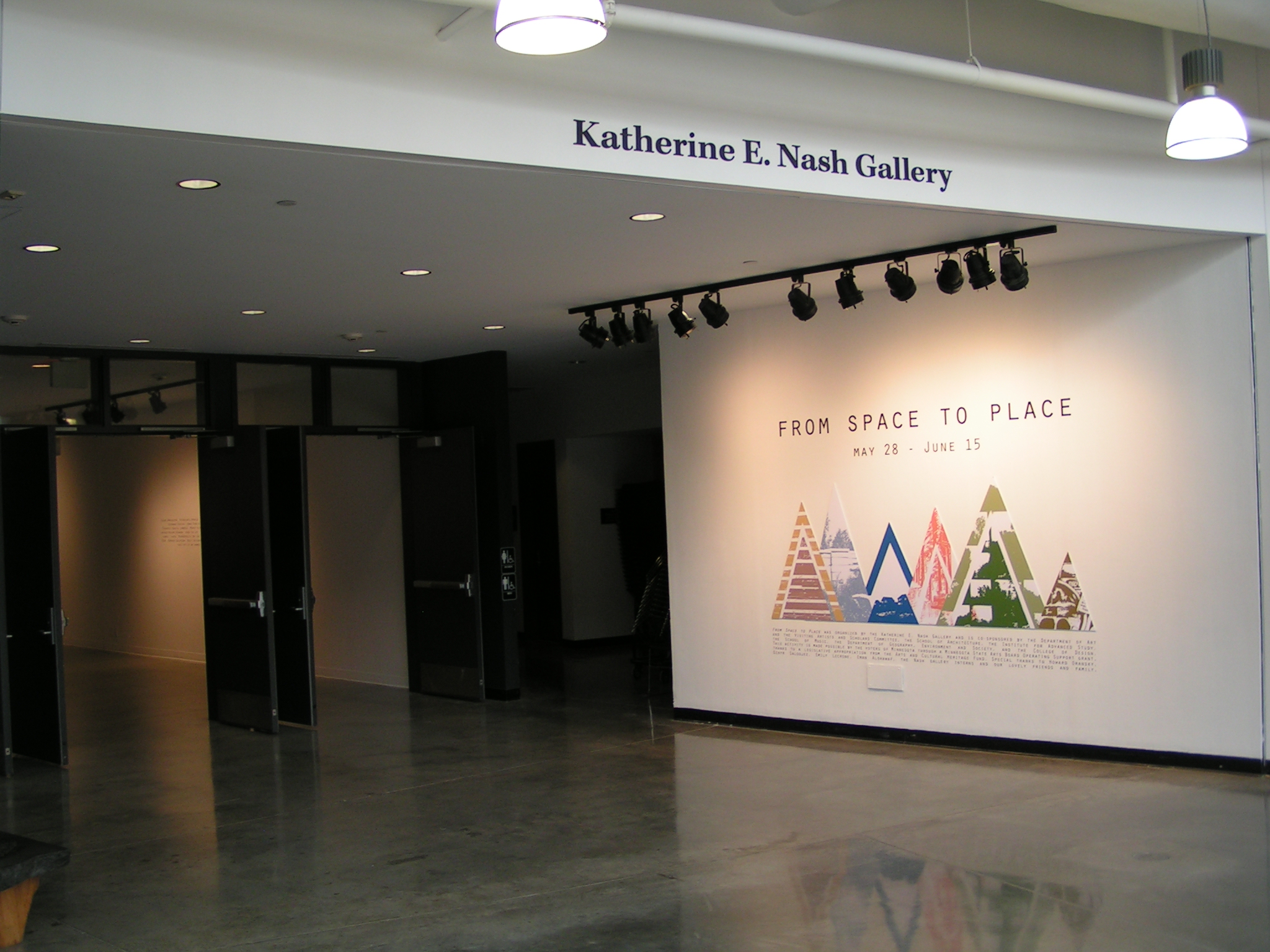
Entrance to the gallery

The Katherine E. Nash Gallery is an art gallery located at the University of Minnesota Department of Art on the West Bank of the Mississippi River in Minneapolis, Minnesota in the United States. Founded by Katherine Nash during the 1970s, the gallery occupies 4,900 square feet (455 m^{2}) in the department's Regis Center for Art.
